The cantatas composed by Johann Sebastian Bach, known as Bach cantatas, are a body of work consisting of over 200 surviving independent works, and at least several dozen that are considered lost. As far as known, Bach's earliest cantatas date from 1707, the year he moved to Mühlhausen, although he may have begun composing them at his previous post in Arnstadt.

In his first years in Leipzig, starting after Trinity of 1723, Bach regularly composed a new cantata every week, although some of these cantatas were adapted (at least in part) from work he had composed before his Leipzig era. Works from three annual cycles of cantatas for the liturgical calendar have survived. These relate to the readings prescribed by the Lutheran liturgy for the specific occasion. The last known cantata was composed in 1745.

Bach's cantatas usually require four soloists and a four-part choir, but he also wrote solo cantatas (i.e. for one soloist singer) and dialogue cantatas for two singers. The words of Bach's cantatas, almost always entirely in German, consist mostly of 18th-century poetry, Lutheran hymns and dicta. Hymns were mostly set to their Lutheran chorale tune. His chorale cantata cycle contains at least 40 chorale cantatas, each of these entirely based on text and tune of such hymn.

Titles of the cantatas 

Although the German term Bachkantate (Bach cantata) became very familiar, Bach himself rarely used the title Cantata in his manuscripts. In , he wrote Cantata à Voce Sola e Stromenti (Cantata for solo voice and instruments).

Bach often wrote a title page for the autograph score and copies of the original parts. For example, he titled the parts of Aus tiefer Not schrei ich zu dir, BWV 38, using a mix of languages to describe the occasion, the incipit, the precise scoring and his name: "Dominica 21. post Trinit / Aus tieffer Noth schrey ich zu dir. / â / 4. Voc. / 2. Hautbois. / 2. Violini. / Viola. / 4. Tromboni / e / Continuo. / di  / Signore / J.S.Bach". The occasion for which the piece was performed is given first, in Latin: "" (21st Sunday after Trinity Sunday, with Trinit short for Trinitatem). The title follows, given in German in the orthography of Bach's time. The scoring and finally his name appear in a mix of French and Italian, the common languages among musicians at the time, partly abbreviated.

BWV number 

Bach wrote more than 200 cantatas, of which many have survived. In the Bach-Werke-Verzeichnis (BWV), Wolfgang Schmieder assigned them each a number within groups: 1–200 (sacred cantatas), 201–216 (secular cantatas), and 217–224 (cantatas of doubtful authorship). Since Schmieder's designation, several of the cantatas he thought authentic have been redesignated as "spurious." However, the spurious cantatas retain their BWV numbers. The List of Bach cantatas is organized by BWV number but sortable by other criteria.

Structure of a Bach cantata 

A typical Bach cantata of his first year in Leipzig follows the scheme:
 Opening chorus
 Recitative
 Aria
 Recitative (or Arioso)
 Aria
 Chorale

The opening chorus is usually a polyphonic setting, with the orchestra presenting the themes or contrasting material first. Most arias follow the form of a da capo aria, repeating the first part after a middle section. The final chorale is typically a homophonic setting of a traditional melody.

Each part is a sequence of an opening movement, five movements with alternating recitatives and arias, and a chorale. In an exemplary way both cantatas cover the prescribed readings: starting with a related psalm from the Old Testament, Part I reflects the Gospel and Part II the Epistle.

Bach did not follow any strict scheme but composed as he wanted to express the words. A solo movement begins , because its first words speak of silence. Many cantatas composed in Weimar are set like chamber music, mostly for soloists, with a four-part setting only in the closing chorale, which may have been sung by the soloists. In an early cantata, Bach marked a repeat of the opening chorus after the chorale.

In , for the first Sunday in Advent, the beginning of a new liturgical year, he rendered the opening chorus as a French overture.

Singers and instrumentation

Vocal 

Typically Bach employs soprano, alto, tenor and bass soloists and a four-part choir, also SATB. He sometimes assigns the voice parts to the dramatic situation, for example soprano for innocence or alto for motherly feelings.

In the absence of clear documentary evidence, there are different options as to how many singers to deploy per part in choral sections.  This is reflected in the recordings discussed below. Ton Koopman, for example, is a conductor who has recorded a complete set of the cantatas and who favours a choir with four singers per part. On the other hand, some modern performances and recordings use one voice per part. Joshua Rifkin is well known is an advocate of this approach, although it has yet to be followed through in a complete set of cantatas. Nonetheless, Bach would have had more singers available at Leipzig, for example, while the space in the court chapel in Weimar was limited. One size of choir probably does not fit all the cantatas.

Instrumental 

The orchestra that Bach used is based on string instruments (violin, viola) and basso continuo, typically played by cello, double bass (an octave lower) and organ. A continuo bass is the rule in Baroque music; its absence is noteworthy and often has a special reason, such as describing fragility.

The specific character of a cantata or a single movement is rather defined by wind instruments, such as oboe, oboe da caccia, oboe d'amore, flauto traverso, recorder, trumpet, horn, trombone, and timpani. In movements with winds, a bassoon usually joins the continuo group.

Festive occasions call for richer instrumentation. Some instruments also carry symbolic meaning, such as a trumpet, the royal instrument of the Baroque, for divine majesty and three trumpets for the Trinity. In an aria of BWV 172, addressing the Heiligste Dreifaltigkeit (Most holy Trinity), the bass is accompanied only by three trumpets and timpani.

In many arias Bach uses obbligato instruments, which accompany the singer as an equal partner. These instrumental parts are frequently set in virtuoso repetitive patterns called figuration. Instruments include, in addition to the ones mentioned, organ, flauto piccolo (sopranino recorder), violino piccolo, viola d'amore, violoncello piccolo (a smaller cello), tromba da tirarsi (slide trumpet) and corno da tirarsi.

In his early compositions Bach also used instruments that had become old-fashioned, such as viola da gamba and violone.

Solo cantata 

Dialogue cantata 

Some cantatas are structured as a dialogue, mostly for Jesus and the Soul (bass and soprano), set like miniature operas. Bach titled them for example , concerto in dialogue.

Text of Bach's sacred cantatas 
Music was expected for all Sundays and holidays except the quiet times (tempus clausum) of Advent and Lent; the cantatas were supposed to reflect the readings. Ideally, a cantata text started with an Old Testament quotation related to the readings, and reflected both the Epistle and the Gospel, as in the exemplary . Most of the solo movements are based on poetry of contemporary writers, such as court poet Salomon Franck in Weimar or Georg Christian Lehms or Picander in Leipzig, with whom Bach collaborated. The final words were usually a stanza from a chorale. Bach's Chorale cantatas are based exclusively on one chorale, for example the early , and most cantatas of his second annual cycle in Leipzig.

The German text may pose difficulties in translation and comprehension. Sometimes caused by archaic language, these issues are also a result of the different social context of modern artists and listeners, who do not share the same biblical and theological knowledge and perspectives as Bach or his audience.

Periods of cantata composition 

The following lists of works (some marked as questioned) rely mainly on Alfred Dürr's Die Kantaten von Johann Sebastian Bach. Usually the cantatas appear in the year of their first performance, sometimes also for later performances and then in brackets.

Mühlhausen 

Bach moved to Mühlhausen in 1707 when he was 22 to take up an appointment as the organist of St. Blasius church. There is evidence suggesting that he composed a cantata as an audition piece for Mühlhausen, and this may have been . One or two more surviving cantatas may have been composed while Bach was at his previous post in Arnstadt, for example, .

A couple of the surviving cantatas can be firmly dated to his time in Mühlhausen. For example, was composed for the inauguration of the town council in 1708. By Bach's own account, was also composed at Mühlhausen. Other cantatas are assumed to date from this period:
 , related to Psalm 146, likely for New Year's Day
 , assumed to be a wedding cantata
 , a funeral cantata

Weimar 

Bach worked in Weimar from 1708. He composed a secular cantata, Was mir behagt, ist nur die muntre Jagd, BWV 208, in 1713. His goal was to compose a complete set of cantatas for the liturgical year within four years. The cantatas 54 and 199 were performed within the cycle but possibly composed earlier.
1713: ? * 63?
1714:  *  * 172 * 21 * 54 * 199 * 61 * 152
1715:  * 165 * 185 * 162 * 163 * 132
1716:  * 161 * 80a *70a * 186a * 147a

Köthen 

Bach worked in Köthen from 1717 to 1723, where he composed for example the Brandenburg Concertos. He had no responsibility for church music, but his employer Prince Leopold did commission secular cantatas.
1717?:  (or between 1720 and 1722)
1718: 
1719: 
He continued to compose for the court until Leopold's funeral in 1729. There is evidence that he reused musical material from works that he premiered in Leipzig in the 1720s, for example the secular cantata , believed to have been composed to honour one of the Bach's academic colleagues in Leipzig, was the basis of a secular cantata with a text in honour of Leopold's second wife.

1726: Steigt freudig in die Luft, BWV 36a
1729:

Leipzig 
Church cantata performances alternated in the two churches for ordinary Sundays and took place in both churches on high holidays such as Christmas, then one in the morning, one in the afternoon, and again alternating for the three days such an occasion was celebrated. There is debate whether Bach performed , there a week before he began his cantorate. Bach started it on the first Sunday after Trinity of 1723 and wrote a first annual cycle. Bach's major works such as the Passions and the Mass in B minor are inserted in the listing for comparison.

1723:  *  (audition pieces)

First cantata cycle 

1723:  * 76 * (21) * 24 * 167 * 147 * Magnificat * 186 * 136 * 105 * 46 * 179 * (199) * 69a * 77 * 25 * 119 * 138 * 95 * 148 * 48 * (162) * 109 * 89 * (163?) * 60 * 90 * 70 * (61) * (63) * 40 * 64
1724: Singet dem Herrn ein neues Lied, BWV 190 * 153 * 65 * 154 * (155) * 73 * 81 * 83 * 144 * 181 + (18) * (22 23) * (182) * St John Passion * (4) * 66 * 134 * 67 * 104 * (12) * 166 * 86 * 37 * 44 * 59 * 173 * 184 * 194

Second cantata cycle 

After Trinity of 1724 he started a second annual cycle of mainly chorale cantatas. The chorale was typically the chorale prescribed for that week ( or ). These cantatas were performed even after his death, according to Christoph Wolff probably because the well-known hymns were appealing to the audience.
1724:  * 2 * 7 * 135 * 10 * 93 * 107 * 178 * 94 * 101 * 113 * 33 * 78 * 99 * 8 * 130 * 114 * 96 * 5 * 180 * 38 * 115 * 139 * 26 * 116 * 62 * 91 * 121 * 133 * 122
1725:  * 123 * 124 * 3 * 111 * 92 * 125 * 126 * 127 * 1

The new cantatas Bach composed for Easter of 1725 and afterwards were not chorale cantatas:
1725: BWV 249, early version (later versions known as the Easter Oratorio but the 1725 version was a cantata) * 6 * 42 * 85 * 103 * 108 * 87 * 128 * 183 * 74 * 68 * 175 * 176
Two of these, BWV 128 and BWV 68, both starting with a chorale fantasia, are sometimes seen as included in the chorale cantata cycle.

Other cantatas by Bach that are usually seen as belonging to the chorale cantata cycle:
 BWV 4 (version as performed again at Easter 1725, somewhat different from the early Mühlhausen version) * 137 (1725) * 58 (1727) * 129 (1727) * 80 (1727 or later, although an early version of this cantata, BWV 80b, may have been composed for or performed on Reformation Day in 1724) * 112 (1731) * 140 (1731) * 177 (1732) * 9 (1732) * 14 (1735)

For four further chorale cantatas it is unclear for which occasion they were composed, and whether they were intended to be added to the cycle:
 BWV 117 (1728–1731) * 192 (1730) * 100 (1732–1735) * 97 (1734?)

Third to fifth year in Leipzig

After Trinity of 1725 Bach began a third annual cycle, but with less consistency. The first cantata is written for the ninth Sunday after Trinity, but the following year he added a substantial work for the first Sunday after Trinity. The cycle extends over several years, although the cantatas from 1727 have been termed as "between the third and fourth cycles". Cantatas for some occasions are not extant.

Picander cycle of 1728–29
 
There is some circumstantial evidence that a complete fourth cycle of Bach cantatas, in scholarship indicated as the Picander cycle, may have existed.

Extant cantatas of the fourth cycle:
1728: 149 * 188 * 197a * 117
1729:  *  *  * 156 * 159 * 145 * 174

Other cantatas and church music 

Not belonging to the foregoing:
1730: Jauchzet Gott in allen Landen, BWV 51
1731:  * 
1732:  * 
1733: Kyrie–Gloria Mass, BWV 232 I (early version) * 
1734:  * Christmas Oratorio
1735:  (Ascension Oratorio)
1738?: Kyrie–Gloria Masses, BWV 233–236
1742:  * 
1744?: 
1745: 
1748?: Mass in B minor, BWV 232 (largely a compilation of previously composed music)

Parodies 

Bach sometimes reused an earlier composition, typically revising and improving it in a process called parody. For example, a movement from a partita for violin, in ceaseless motion, was arranged as an orchestral sinfonia with the organ as solo instrument for the wedding cantata 120a and again in Cantata 29, for which the organ was accompanied by a full orchestra dominated by trumpets. Not only a single movement but a complete cantata was reworked from the Shepherd cantata , to become the Easter Oratorio. Bach used parody to be able to deliver cantatas for Christmas, Easter and Pentecost, which were each celebrated for a period of three days. His Easter cantata , is a parody of six of eight movements of the cantata for New Year's Day, . Six movements of his congratulatory cantata , form the cantata for Pentecost Monday of 1724, while a seventh movement was made part of the cantata for Pentecost Tuesday of 1725, .

Oratorios 

Bach's oratorios can be considered as expanded cantatas. They were also meant to be performed during church services. Distinct from the cantatas, a narrator, the Evangelist, tells a story in the exact Bible wording, while soloists and the choir have "roles" such as Mary or "the shepherds", in addition to reflective chorales or arias commenting on the story. The St Matthew Passion and the St John Passion were intended to be performed on Good Friday, before and after the sermon. The six parts of the Christmas Oratorio were intended to be performed on six feast days of the Christmas season, each part composed as a cantata with an opening chorus (except in Part 2) and a closing chorale.

Performances by Bach 

Bach composed the cantatas and performed them, conducting from the keyboard. The choir was the Thomanerchor, which also served the other main churches of Leipzig for which Bach was responsible. Cantatas, under his personal direction, were performed in the Nikolaikirche and in the Thomaskirche, alternating on ordinary Sundays. On high feast days, the same cantata was performed in the morning in one of these churches, in a vespers service in the other.

Later performances and recordings 

After Bach's death the cantatas fell into obscurity even more than his oratorios. There is some evidence for the chorale cantatas being performed at Leipzig after Bach's death, but the cantatas were little known until a society called the Bach-Gesellschaft began to publish the composer's complete works starting in 1851. Only one of the cantatas, had been published during Bach's lifetime. The cantata , was selected as the first work to appear in the Bach-Gesellschaft-Ausgabe, the first complete edition.

In 1928, The New York Times reported the presentation in Paris of two secular Bach cantatas by opera soprano Marguerite Bériza and her company in staged productions, The Peasant Cantata and The Coffee Cantata.

The number of performances and recordings increased in the decades after the Second World War. In the early 1950s Fritz Lehmann recorded several cantatas with the Berliner Motettenchor and the Berlin Philharmonic. From 1953, Max Thurn conducted for the broadcaster NDR a series of Bach cantatas, with members of the NDR Chor and members of the NDR Sinfonieorchester. Karl Richter called his choir programmatically Münchener Bach-Chor in 1954 and recorded about a third of the cantatas.

Between 1958 and 1987, the London Bach Society, conducted by Paul Steinitz performed all the extant church and secular cantatas, 208 separate works, in various venues, mostly in the Church of St Bartholomew-the-Great, London. Fritz Werner started recording with the Heinrich-Schütz-Chor Heilbronn and the Pforzheim Chamber Orchestra a series that they called Les Grandes Cantates de J.S. Bach.

The Thomanerchor has sung a weekly cantata during the evening service  on Saturday.
The cantatas are also regularly performed on Sundays at Holy Trinity Lutheran Church, New York City, under the direction of the Cantor (currently Donald R. Meineke).

Complete recordings 
While individual cantatas were recorded as early as the 1930s, a complete set was not attempted until the 1970s when Nikolaus Harnoncourt and Gustav Leonhardt began recording the Teldec set. This 20-year collaboration used historical instruments, with boys' choirs and boy soloists for most soprano and a few alto parts. Harnoncourt conducted the Wiener Sängerknaben or the Tölzer Knabenchor and the Concentus Musicus Wien. Leonhardt conducted the Tölzer Knabenchor, Knabenchor Hannover and the Collegium Vocale Gent, and the ensemble Leonhardt-Consort. Helmuth Rilling, Gächinger Kantorei, and the Bach-Collegium Stuttgart completed a recording of the sacred cantatas and oratorios on Bach's 300th birthday, 21 March 1985. Ton Koopman and the Amsterdam Baroque Orchestra & Choir recorded all vocal works of Bach in 10 years starting in 1994, including the cantatas. Sir John Eliot Gardiner and his Monteverdi Choir undertook the Bach Cantata Pilgrimage, performing and recording in the year 2000 the sacred cantatas at churches all over Europe and in the United States. Sigiswald Kuijken has recorded Cantatas for the Complete Liturgical Year with La Petite Bande and the soloists forming the choir. Masaaki Suzuki commenced in 1995 a project to record the complete sacred cantatas with his Bach Collegium Japan for the Swedish label BIS; he completed the process in 2013. Pieter Jan Leusink recorded the complete cantatas in 15 months in 1999 and 2000 with the Holland Boys Choir and Netherlands Bach Collegium for Brilliant Classics.

The Fifth Gospel

In 1929 the Swedish bishop Nathan Söderblom, a recipient of the Nobel Peace Prize, called Bach's cantatas the Fifth Gospel.

Bach cantatas listed in the first chapter of the Bach-Werke-Verzeichnis (1998)

|- style="background: #E3F6CE;"
| data-sort-value="0001.000" | 1	
| data-sort-value="001.002" | 1.
| 1725-03-25
| Cantata Wie schön leuchtet der Morgenstern (Annunciation)
| F maj.
| data-sort-value="stbSATB Hnx2 Odcx2 Vlx2 Str Bc" | stbSATB 2Hn 2Odc 2Vl Str Bc
| data-sort-value="000.01: 001" | 1: 1
| data-sort-value="I/28 2: 003" | I/28.2: 3
| after Z 8359; text after Nicolai
| 
|- style="background: #E3F6CE;"
| data-sort-value="0002.000" | 2
| data-sort-value="002.002" rowspan="2" | 1.
| rowspan="2" | 1724-06-18
| Cantata Ach Gott, vom Himmel sieh darein (Trinity II)
| G min.
| data-sort-value="atbSATB Tbnx4 Obx2 Str Bc" | atbSATB 4Tbn 2Ob Str Bc
| data-sort-value="000.01: 053" | 1: 53
| data-sort-value="I/16: 081" | I/16: 81
| after Z 4431; text after Luther
| 
|- style="background: #E3F6CE;"
| data-sort-value="0002.006" | 2/6
| chorale setting "Ach Gott, vom Himmel sieh darein" (s. 6)
| G Dor.
| SATB
| data-sort-value="000.01: 072" | 1: 72
| data-sort-value="III/02 1: 026" | III/2.1: 25III/2.2: 156
| after Z 4431; text by Luther
| 
|- style="background: #E3F6CE;"
| data-sort-value="0003.000" | 3
| data-sort-value="003.001" rowspan="2" | 1.
| rowspan="2" | 1725-01-14
| Cantata Ach Gott, wie manches Herzeleid (Epiphany II)
| rowspan="2" | A maj.
| data-sort-value="satbSATB Hn Tbn Obax2 Str Bc" | satbSATB Hn Tbn 2Oba Str Bc
| data-sort-value="000.01: 073" | 1: 73
| data-sort-value="I/05: 189" | I/5: 189
| data-sort-value="after Z 0533a; text after Moller" | after Z 533a; text after Moller
| 
|- style="background: #E3F6CE;"
| data-sort-value="0003.006" | 3/6
| chorale setting "Ach Gott, wie manches Herzeleid" (s. 18)
| SATB
| data-sort-value="000.01: 094" | 1: 94
| data-sort-value="III/02 1: 028" | III/2.1: 26III/2.2: 90
| data-sort-value="after Z 0533a; text by Moller" | after Z 533a; text by Moller
| 
|- style="background: #E3F6CE;"
| data-sort-value="0004.200" | 4.2
| data-sort-value="004.001" rowspan="2" | 1.
| rowspan="2" | 1724-04-09
| Cantata Christ lag in Todes Banden (Easter)
| E min.
| data-sort-value="satbSATB Cnt Tbnx3 Str Bc" | satbSATB Cnt 3Tbn Str Bc
| data-sort-value="000.01: 095" | 1: 95
| data-sort-value="I/09: 001" | I/9: 1
| after BWV 4.1; text by Luther
| 
|- style="background: #E3F6CE;"
| data-sort-value="0004.208" | 4/8
| chorale setting "Christ lag in Todes Banden" (s. 7)
| E min.D min.
| SATB
| data-sort-value="000.01: 124" | 1: 124
| data-sort-value="III/02 2: 104" | III/2.2: 104
| after Z 7012a; text by Luther
| 
|-
| data-sort-value="0004.100" | 4.1
| data-sort-value="004.002" | 1.
| 1707-04-24
| Cantata Christ lag in Todes Banden (Easter; early version, lost)
| 
| data-sort-value="satbSATB Vlx2 Vax2 Bc" | satbSATB 2Vl 2Va Bc
| 
| data-sort-value="I/09: 002" | I/9
| after Z 7012a; → BWV 4.2; text by Luther
| 
|- style="background: #E3F6CE;"
| data-sort-value="0005.000" | 5	
| data-sort-value="005.001" rowspan="3" | 1.
| rowspan="3" | 1724-10-15
| Cantata Wo soll ich fliehen hin (Trinity XIX)
| rowspan="3" | G min.
| data-sort-value="satbSATB Tdt Obx2 Str Bc" | satbSATB Tdt 2Ob Str Bc
| data-sort-value="000.01: 125" | 1: 125
| I/24: 133
| after Z 2164; text after Heermann
| 
|- style="background: #E3F6CE;"
| data-sort-value="0005.007" rowspan="2" | 5/7
| chorale setting "Wo soll ich fliehen hin" (s. 11)
| rowspan="2" | SATB
| data-sort-value="000.01: 150" rowspan="2" | 1: 150
| rowspan="2" data-sort-value="III/02 1: 093" | III/2.1: 66III/2.2: 180
| after Z 2164; text by Heermann
| rowspan="2" | 
|- style="background: #E3F6CE;"
| chorale setting "Auf meinen lieben Gott"
| after Z 2164
|- style="background: #E3F6CE;"
| data-sort-value="0006.000" | 6
| data-sort-value="006.001" rowspan="2" | 1.
| rowspan="2" | 1725-04-02
| Cantata Bleib bei uns, denn es will Abend werden (Easter 2)
| C min.
| data-sort-value="satbSATB Obx2 Odc Str Vc Bc" | satbSATB 2Ob Odc Str Vc Bc
| data-sort-value="000.01: 151" | 1: 151
| data-sort-value="I/10: 043" | I/10: 43
| data-sort-value="after Z 0439 (/3: → BWV 0649)" | after Z 439 (/3: → BWV 649), Z 350a (/6); text after Lk 24:29 (/1), by Melanchthon & Selnecker (/3), Luther (/6)
| 
|- style="background: #E3F6CE;"
| data-sort-value="0006.006" | 6/6
| chorale setting "Erhalt uns, Herr, bei deinem Wort" (s. 2)
| G min.
| SATB
| data-sort-value="000.01: 176" | 1: 176
| data-sort-value="III/02 2: 040" | III/2.2: 40
| data-sort-value="after Z 0350; text by Luther" | after Z 350a; text by Luther
| 
|- style="background: #E3F6CE;"
| data-sort-value="0007.000" | 7	
| data-sort-value="007.001" | 1.
| 1724-06-24
| Cantata Christ unser Herr zum Jordan kam (24 June: feast of John the Baptist)
| E min.
| data-sort-value="atbSATB Obax2 Vlx2 Str Bc" | atbSATB 2Oba 2Vl Str Bc
| data-sort-value="000.01: 177" | 1: 177
| data-sort-value="I/29: 025" | I/29: 25
| after Z 7246; text after Luther
| 
|- style="background: #E3F6CE;"
| data-sort-value="0008.100" | 8.1
| data-sort-value="008.002" | 1.
| 1724-09-24
| Cantata Liebster Gott, wenn werd ich sterben? (Trinity XVI; 1st version)
| E maj.
| data-sort-value="satbSATB Hn Fl Obax2 Str Bc" | satbSATB Hn Fl 2Oba Str Bc
| data-sort-value="000.01: 211" | 1: 211
| I/23: 105
| after Z 6634; by Vetter, D. (/6); text after Neumann; → BWV 8.2
| 
|- style="background: #E3F6CE;"
| data-sort-value="0008.200" | 8.2	
| data-sort-value="009.002" | 1.
| 1747-09-17
| Cantata Liebster Gott, wenn werd ich sterben? (Trinity XVI; 2nd version)
| D maj.
| data-sort-value="satbSATB Fl Obax2 Tai Vlx2 Str Bc" | satbSATB Fl 2Oba Tai 2Vl Str Bc
| 
| I/23: 163
| data-sort-value="after BWV 0008.1" | after BWV 8.1
| 
|- style="background: #E3F6CE;"
| data-sort-value="0009.000" | 9
| data-sort-value="009.003" rowspan="2" | 1.
| rowspan="2" | 1732-07-20
| Cantata Es ist das Heil uns kommen her (Trinity VI)
| rowspan="2" | E maj.
| satbSATB Fl Oba Str Bc
| data-sort-value="000.01: 243" | 1: 243
| data-sort-value="I/17 2: 083" | I/17.2: 83
| after Z 4430; text after Speratus
| 
|- style="background: #E3F6CE;"
| data-sort-value="0009.007" | 9/7
| chorale setting "Es ist das Heil uns kommen her" (s. 12)
| SATB
| data-sort-value="000.01: 274" | 1: 274
| data-sort-value="III/02 1: 070" | III/2.1: 52III/2.2: 172
| after Z 4430; text by Speratus
| 
|- style="background: #E3F6CE;"
| data-sort-value="0010.000" | 10
| data-sort-value="010.002" rowspan="2" | 1.
| rowspan="2" | 1724-07-02
| Cantata Meine Seel erhebt den Herren a.k.a. German Magnificat (Visitation)
| rowspan="2" | G min.
| data-sort-value="satbSATB Tr Obx2 Str Bc" | satbSATB Tr 2Ob Str Bc
| data-sort-value="000.01: 275" | 1: 275
| data-sort-value="I/28 2: 131" | I/28.2: 131
| after Magnificat peregrini toni; text after Magnificat; → BWV 648
| 
|- style="background: #E3F6CE;"
| data-sort-value="0010.007" | 10/7
| chorale setting "Meine Seel erhebt den Herren" (doxology, ss. 10–11)
| SATB
| data-sort-value="000.01: 303" | 1: 303
| data-sort-value="III/02 1: 118" | III/2.1: 82III/2.2: 205
| after Magnificat peregrini toni; text: German Magnificat
| 
|- style="background: #E3F6CE;"
| data-sort-value="0012.000" rowspan="2" | 12	
| data-sort-value="011.003" rowspan="2" | 1.
| 1714-04-22
| rowspan="2" | Cantata Weinen, Klagen, Sorgen, Zagen (Jubilate; two versions)
| F Dor.
| data-sort-value="atbSATB Tr Ob Vlx2 Vax2 Bas Bc" rowspan="2" | atbSATB Tr Ob 2Vl 2Va Bas Bc
| data-sort-value="000.02: 059" | 2: 59
| data-sort-value="I/11 2: 001" rowspan="2" | I/11.2: 1
| rowspan="2" | after Z 5629 (/7: → BWV 69.1/6); text by Franck, S.?; text after Acts 14:22 (/3); text by Rodigast (/7); /2 → BWV 232/14
| rowspan="2" | 
|- style="background: #E3F6CE;"
| 1724-04-30
| G min.
| 
|- style="background: #E3F6CE;"
| data-sort-value="0013.000" | 13
| data-sort-value="012.002" rowspan="3" | 1.
| rowspan="3" | 1726-01-20
| Cantata Meine Seufzer, meine Tränen (Epiphany II)
| D min.
| data-sort-value="satbSATB Flx2 Odc Str Bc" | satbSATB 2Fl Odc Str Bc
| data-sort-value="000.02: 079" | 2: 79
| data-sort-value="I/05: 229" | I/5: 229
| after Z 6543 (/3), Z 2293b (/6); text by Lehms, Heermann (/3), Fleming (/6)
| 
|- style="background: #E3F6CE;"
| data-sort-value="0013.006" rowspan="2" | 13/6
| chorale setting "In allen meinen Taten" (s. 9)
| B♭ maj.
| rowspan="2" | SATB
| data-sort-value="000.02: 098" | 2: 98
| data-sort-value="III/02 2: 058" | III/2.2: 58
| rowspan="2" | after Z 2293b; text by Fleming
| rowspan="2" | 
|- style="background: #E3F6CE;"
| chorale setting "Nun ruhen alle Wälder"
| G maj.
| 
| data-sort-value="III/02 2: 216" | III/2.2: 216
|- style="background: #E3F6CE;"
| data-sort-value="0014.000" | 14	
| data-sort-value="013.002" rowspan="2" | 1.
| rowspan="2" | 1735-01-30
| Cantata Wär Gott nicht mit uns diese Zeit (Epiphany IV)
| rowspan="2" | G min.
| data-sort-value="stbSATB Hn Obx2 Str Bc" | stbSATB Hn 2Ob Str Bc
| data-sort-value="000.02: 099" | 2: 99
| data-sort-value="I/06: 139" | I/6: 139
| after Z 4434; text after Luther
| 
|- style="background: #E3F6CE;"
| data-sort-value="0014.005" | 14/5
| chorale setting "Wär Gott nicht mit uns diese Zeit" (s. 3)
| SATB
| data-sort-value="000.02: 132" | 2: 132
| data-sort-value="III/02 1: 128" | III/2.1: 88III/2.2: 103
| after Z 4434; text by Luther
| 
|- style="background: #E3F6CE;"
| data-sort-value="0016.000" rowspan="2" | 16
| data-sort-value="014.003" rowspan="3" | 1.
| 1726-01-01
| rowspan="2" | Cantata Herr Gott, dich loben wir (New Year/Circumcision)
| rowspan="3" | A min.
| data-sort-value="atbSATB Hn Obx2 Odc Str Bc" | atbSATB Hn 2Ob Odc Str Bc
| data-sort-value="000.02: 173" rowspan="2" | 2: 173
| data-sort-value="I/04: 103" rowspan="2" | I/4: 103
| rowspan="2" | after Z 8652 (/1), 5267 (/6; → BWV 419); text by Lehms, Luther (/1), Eber (/6)
| rowspan="2" | 
|- style="background: #E3F6CE;"
| 1731-01-01
| data-sort-value="atbSATB Hn Obx2 Va Str Bc" | atbSATB Hn 2Ob Va Str Bc
|- style="background: #E3F6CE;"
| data-sort-value="0016.006" | 16/6
| 1726-01-01
| chorale setting "Helft mir Gotts Güte preisen" (s. 6)
| SATB
| data-sort-value="000.02: 198" | 2: 198
| data-sort-value="III/02 2: 056" | III/2.2: 56
| after Z 5267; text by Eber
| 
|- style="background: #E3F6CE;"
| data-sort-value="0017.000" | 17
| data-sort-value="015.002" rowspan="2" | 1.
| rowspan="2" | 1726-09-22
| Cantata Wer Dank opfert, der preiset mich (Trinity XIV)
| rowspan="2" | A maj.
| data-sort-value="satbSATB Obx2 Str Bc" | satbSATB 2Ob Str Bc
| data-sort-value="000.02: 199" | 2: 199
| I/21: 147
| after Z 8244 (/7); text: Meiningen, after Ps 50:23 (/1; → BWV 236/6), Lk 17:15-16 (/4), by Gramann (/7)
| 
|- style="background: #E3F6CE;"
| data-sort-value="0017.007" | 17/7
| chorale setting "Nun lob, mein Seel, den Herren" (s. 3)
| SATB
| data-sort-value="000.02: 225" | 2: 225
| data-sort-value="III/02 2: 004" | III/2.2: 4
| after Z 8244; text by Gramann
| 
|- style="background: #E3F6CE;"
| data-sort-value="0018.200" | 18.2
| data-sort-value="016.002" rowspan="2" | 1.
| rowspan="2" | 1724-02-13
| Cantata Gleichwie der Regen und Schnee vom Himmel fällt (Sexagesima)
| rowspan="2" | A min.
| data-sort-value="stbSATB Flx2 Bas Vax4 Vc Bc" | stbSATB 2Fl Bas 4Va Vc Bc
| data-sort-value="000.02: 227" | 2: 227(in g)
| data-sort-value="I/07: 107" | I/7: 107
| data-sort-value="after BWV 0018.1" | after BWV 18.1; text by Neumeister, after Is 55:10–11 (/2), Luther (/3), by Spengler (/5)
| 
|- style="background: #E3F6CE;"
| data-sort-value="0018.205" rowspan="2" | 18/5
| chorale setting "Durch Adams Fall ist ganz verderbt" (s. 8)
| rowspan="2" | SATB
| data-sort-value="000.02: 252" rowspan="2" | 2: 252(in g)
| data-sort-value="III/02 2: 071" | III/2.2: 71
| after Z 7549; text by Spengler
| rowspan="2" | 
|- style="background: #E3F6CE;"
| data-sort-value="016.003" rowspan="2" | 1.
| rowspan="2" | 1715-02-24
| chorale setting "Ich ruf zu dir, Herr Jesu Christ"
| rowspan="2" | G min.
| data-sort-value="III/02 2: 056" | III/2.2: 56
| after Z 7549; text by Agricola
|- style="background: #E3F6CE;"
| data-sort-value="0018.001" | 18.1
| Cantata Gleichwie der Regen und Schnee vom Himmel fällt (Sexagesima)
| data-sort-value="stbSATB Bas Vax4 Vc Bc" | stbSATB Bas 4Va Vc Bc
| 
| data-sort-value="I/07: 081" | I/7: 81
| after Z 7549 (/5); text by Neumeister, after Is 55:10–11 (/2), Luther (/3), by Spengler (/5); → BWV 18.2
| 
|- style="background: #E3F6CE;"
| data-sort-value="0019.000" | 19
| data-sort-value="017.003" rowspan="3" | 1.
| rowspan="3" | 1726-09-29
| Cantata Es erhub sich ein Streit (Michaelmas)
| rowspan="3" | C maj.
| data-sort-value="stbSATB Trx3 Tmp Obx2 Obax2 Tai Str Bc" | stbSATB 3Tr Tmp 2Ob 2Oba Tai Str Bc
| data-sort-value="000.02: 253" | 2: 253
| data-sort-value="I/30: 055" | I/30: 55
| after Z 6543 (/7); text after Picander
| 
|- style="background: #E3F6CE;"
| data-sort-value="0019.007" rowspan="2" | 19/7
| chorale setting "Freu dich sehr, o meine Seele" (s. 9)
| rowspan="2" | SATB
| data-sort-value="000.02: 288" rowspan="2" | 2: 288
| rowspan="2" data-sort-value="III/02 1: 087" | III/2.1: 62III/2.2: 177
| after Z 6543
| rowspan="2" | 
|- style="background: #E3F6CE;"
| chorale setting "Weg, mein Herz, mit den Gedanken"
| after Z 6543; text by Gerhardt
|- style="background: #E3F6CE;"
| data-sort-value="0020.000" | 20
| data-sort-value="018.002" rowspan="2" | 1.
| rowspan="2" | 1724-06-11
| Cantata O Ewigkeit, du Donnerwort (Trinity I)
| rowspan="2" | F maj.
| data-sort-value="atbSATB Tdt Tmp Obx3 Str Bc" | atbSATB Tdt Tmp 3Ob Str Bc
| data-sort-value="000.02: 291" | 2: 291
| I/15: 133
| after Z 5820; text after Rist
| 
|- style="background: #E3F6CE;"
| data-sort-value="0020.007" | 20/720/11
| chorale setting "O Ewigkeit, du Donnerwort" (ss. 11, 16)
| SATB
| data-sort-value="000.02: 317" | 2: 317,327
| data-sort-value="III/02 2: 017" | III/2.2: 17
| after Z 5820; text by Rist
| 
|- style="background: #E3F6CE;"
| data-sort-value="0021.100" | 21.1
| data-sort-value="019.002" | 1.
| data-sort-value="1713-11-30" | before Dec. 1713
| Cantata Ich hatte viel Bekümmernis (1st version: in ogni tempore; 1714-06-17: Trinity III)
| C min.
| data-sort-value="satbSATB Trx3 Tmp Ob Str Bc" | satbSATB 3Tr Tmp Ob Str Bc
| 
| I/16: 109
| after Z 2778 (/9); text by Franck, S.?; text after Ps 94:19 (/2), 42:12 (/6), 116:7 (/9), Rv 5:12-13 (/11), by Neumark (/9); → BWV 21.2
| 
|- style="background: #E3F6CE;"
| data-sort-value="0021.200" | 21.2
| data-sort-value="019.003" | 1.
| data-sort-value="1720-09-28" |  1720
| Cantata Ich hatte viel Bekümmernis (2nd version: in ogni tempore)
| D min.
| data-sort-value="satbSATB Trx3 Tmp Ob Str Bas Bc" | satbSATB 3Tr Tmp Ob Str Bas Bc
| 
| I/16
| after BWV 21.1 (same text); → BWV 21.3
| 
|- style="background: #E3F6CE;"
| data-sort-value="0021.300" | 21.3
| data-sort-value="019.004" | 1.
| 1723-06-13
| Cantata Ich hatte viel Bekümmernis (3rd version: Trinity III)
| C min.
| data-sort-value="satbSATB Trx3 Tmp Tnex4 Ob Str Bas Bc" | satbSATB 3Tr Tmp 4Tne Ob Str Bas Bc
| data-sort-value="000.05 1: 001" | 51: 1
| I/16
| after BWV 21.2 (same text)
| 
|- style="background: #E3F6CE;"
| data-sort-value="0022.000" | 22
| data-sort-value="021.001" | 1.
| 1723-02-07
| Cantata Jesus nahm zu sich die Zwölfe (Estomihi)
| 
| satbSATB Ob Str Bc
| data-sort-value="000.05 1: 065" | 51: 65
| data-sort-value="I/08: 001" | I/8: 1
| after Z 4297a (/5); text after Luke 18:31, 34 (/1), by Cruciger (/5)
| 
|- style="background: #E3F6CE;"
| data-sort-value="0023.100" | 23.1
| data-sort-value="022.001" | 1.
| data-sort-value="1723-01-15" | 1723
| Cantata Du wahrer Gott und Davids Sohn (1st version, 3 movements: Estomihi)
| C min.
| data-sort-value="satbSATB Obx2 Str Bc" | satbSATB 2Ob Str Bc
| data-sort-value="000.05 1: 093" | 51: 93
| data-sort-value="I/08: 033" | I/8: 33
| data-sort-value="→ BWV 0023.2" | → BWV 23.2, .3
| 
|- style="background: #E3F6CE;"
| data-sort-value="0023.200" | 23.2
| data-sort-value="022.002" | 1.
| 1723-02-07
| Cantata Du wahrer Gott und Davids Sohn (2nd version, 4 movements: Estomihi)
| B min.
| data-sort-value="satbSATB Cnt Tbnx3 Obax2 Str Bc" | satbSATB Cnt 3Tbn 2Oba Str Bc
| 
| data-sort-value="I/08: 069" | I/8: 69
| data-sort-value="after BWV 0023.1" | after BWV 23.1, Z 58 (/4); text by Luther after Agnus Dei (/4); → BWV 23.3, 245.2/40
| 
|- style="background: #E3F6CE;"
| data-sort-value="0023.300" | 23.3
| data-sort-value="022.003" | 1.
| data-sort-value="1729-12-31" | 1728–1731
| Cantata Du wahrer Gott und Davids Sohn (3rd version, 4 movements: Estomihi)
| C min.
| data-sort-value="satbSATB Obx2 Str Bc" | satbSATB 2Ob Str Bc
| data-sort-value="000.05 1: 094" | 51: 93
| data-sort-value="I/08: 035" | I/8: 33
| data-sort-value="after BWV 0023.2" | after BWV 23.1, .2; text by Luther after Agnus Dei (/4)
| 
|- style="background: #E3F6CE;"
| data-sort-value="0024.000" | 24
| data-sort-value="023.001" rowspan="3" | 1.
| rowspan="3" | 1723-06-20
| Cantata Ein ungefärbt Gemüte (Trinity IV)
| rowspan="3" | F maj.
| data-sort-value="satbSATB Tr Obx2 Obax2 Str Bc" | satbSATB Tr 2Ob 2Oba Str Bc
| data-sort-value="000.05 1: 125" | 51: 125
| data-sort-value="I/17 1: 047" | I/17.1: 47
| after Z 5148 (/6); text by Neumeister, Heermann (/6), after Mt 7:12 (/3)
| 
|- style="background: #E3F6CE;"
| data-sort-value="0024.006" rowspan="2" | 24/6
| chorale setting "O Gott, du frommer Gott" (s. 1)
| rowspan="2" | SATB
| data-sort-value="000.05 1: 150" rowspan="2" | 51: 150
| data-sort-value="III/02 2: 195" rowspan="2" | III/2.2: 195
| after Z 5148; text by Heermann
| rowspan="2" | 
|- style="background: #E3F6CE;"
| chorale setting "Was frag ich nach der Welt"
| after Z 5148; text by Kindermann
|- style="background: #E3F6CE;"
| data-sort-value="0025.000" | 25
| data-sort-value="024.001" rowspan="4" | 1.
| rowspan="4" | 1723-08-29
| Cantata Es ist nichts Gesundes an meinem Leibe (Trinity XIV)
| E min.
| data-sort-value="stbSATB Cnt Tbnx3 Flx3 Obx2 Str Bc" | stbSATB Cnt 3Tbn 3Fl 2Ob Str Bc
| data-sort-value="000.05 1: 153" | 51: 153
| data-sort-value="I/21: 079" | I/21: 79
| after Z 6543 (/6); text after , Ps 38:4 (/1), by Heermann (/6)
| 
|- style="background: #E3F6CE;"
| data-sort-value="0025.006" rowspan="3" | 25/6
| chorale setting "Treuer Gott, ich muss dir klagen" (s. 12)
| rowspan="3" | C maj.
| rowspan="3" | SATB
| data-sort-value="000.05 1: 188" rowspan="3" | 51: 188
| rowspan="2" data-sort-value="III/02 1: 011" | III/2.1: 15III/2.2: 150
| after Z 6543; text by Heermann
| rowspan="3" | 
|- style="background: #E3F6CE;"
| chorale setting "Weg, mein Herz, mit den Gedenken"
| after Z 6543; text by Gerhardt
|- style="background: #E3F6CE;"
| chorale setting "Freu dich sehr, o meine Seele"
| data-sort-value="III/02 2: 168" | III/2.2: 168
| after Z 6543
|- style="background: #E3F6CE;"
| data-sort-value="0026.000" | 26
| data-sort-value="024.002" rowspan="2" | 1.
| rowspan="2" | 1724-11-19
| Cantata Ach wie flüchtig, ach wie nichtig (Trinity XXIV)
| rowspan="2" | A min.
| data-sort-value="satbSATB Hn Fl Obx3 Str Bc" | satbSATB Hn Fl 3Ob Str Bc
| data-sort-value="000.05 1: 189" | 51: 189
| data-sort-value="I/27: 029" | I/27: 29
| after Z 1887b; text after Franck, M.
| 
|- style="background: #E3F6CE;"
| data-sort-value="0026.006" | 26/6
| chorale setting "Ach wie flüchtig, ach wie nichtig" (s. 8)
| SATB
| data-sort-value="000.05 1: 216" | 51: 216
| data-sort-value="III/02 2: 028" | III/2.2: 28
| after Z 1887b; text by Franck, M.
| 
|- style="background: #E3F6CE;"
| data-sort-value="0027.000" | 27
| data-sort-value="025.002" | 1.
| 1726-10-06
| Cantata Wer weiß, wie nahe mir mein Ende? (Trinity XVI)
| C min.
| data-sort-value="satbSSATB Hn Obx2 Odc Str Org Bc" | satbSSATB Hn 2Ob Odc Str Org Bc
| data-sort-value="000.05 1: 217" | 51: 217
| I/23: 221
| after Z 2778 (/1); by Rosenmüller (/6 = BWV Anh. 170); text by E. J. of Schwarzburg-Rudolstadt (/1), Albinus (/6), after Neumeister (/3)
| 
|- style="background: #E3F6CE;"
| data-sort-value="0028.000" | 28
| data-sort-value="026.002" rowspan="3" | 1.
| rowspan="3" | 1725-12-30
| Cantata Gottlob! nun geht das Jahr zu Ende (Christmas I)
| rowspan="3" | A min.
| data-sort-value="satbSATB Cnt Tbnx3 Obx2 Tai Str Bc" | satbSATB Cnt 3Tbn 2Ob Tai Str Bc
| data-sort-value="000.05 1: 245" | 51: 245
| data-sort-value="I/03 2: 075" | I/3.2: 75
| after Z 8244 (/2), 5267 (/6); text by Neumeister, Gramann (/2), Eber (/6), after Jer 32:41 (/3); → BWV 28/2a, Anh. 160/2
| 
|- style="background: #E3F6CE;"
| data-sort-value="0028.006" rowspan="2" | 28/6
| chorale setting "Helft mir Gotts Güte preisen" (s. 12)
| rowspan="2" | SATB
| data-sort-value="000.05 1: 272" rowspan="2" | 51: 272
| data-sort-value="III/02 1: 008" | III/2.1: 13III/2.2: 49
| after Z 5267; text by Eber
| rowspan="2" | 
|- style="background: #E3F6CE;"
| chorale setting "Zeuch ein zu deinen Toren"
| data-sort-value="III/02 2: 015" | III/2.2: 15
| after Z 5267; text by Gerhardt
|-
| data-sort-value="0028.202" | 28/2a
| data-sort-value="027.002" | 1.
| data-sort-value="1725-07-01" | 1725?
| Motet Sei Lob und Preis mit Ehren
| C maj.
| SATB
| data-sort-value="000.39: 167" | 39: 167
| data-sort-value="III/03: 015" | III/3: 15
| data-sort-value="after BWV 0028/2" | after BWV 28/2; ↔ Anh. 160/2; was BWV 231
| 
|- style="background: #E3F6CE;"
| data-sort-value="0029.000" | 29
| data-sort-value="027.003" rowspan="2" | 1.
| rowspan="2" | 1731-08-27
| Cantata Wir danken dir, Gott, wir danken dir (council election)
| rowspan="2" | D maj.
| data-sort-value="satbSATB Trx3 Tmp Obx2 Str Org Bc" | satbSATB 3Tr Tmp 2Ob Str Org Bc
| data-sort-value="000.05 1: 273" | 51: 273
| data-sort-value="I/32 2: 001" | I/32.2: 1
| data-sort-value="after BWV 0120.2/4" | after BWV 120.2/4 (/1), Z 8244 (/8); text after Ps 75:2 (/2; → BWV 232/7, /23), by Gramann (/8)
| 
|- style="background: #E3F6CE;"
| data-sort-value="0029.008" | 29/8
| chorale setting "Nun lob, mein Seel, den Herren" (s. 5)
| SATB
| data-sort-value="000.05 1: 316" | 51: 316
| data-sort-value="III/02 2: 065" | III/2.2: 65
| after Z 8244; text by Gramann
| 
|- style="background: #E3F6CE;"
| data-sort-value="0030.200" | 30.2
| data-sort-value="028.002" rowspan="3" | 1.
| rowspan="3" | 1738-06-24
| Cantata Freue dich, erlöste Schar (24 June: feast of John the Baptist)
| D maj.
| data-sort-value="satbSATB Flx2 Obx2 Oba Vl Str Bc" | satbSATB 2Fl 2Ob Oba Vl Str Bc
| data-sort-value="000.05 1: 321" | 51: 321
| data-sort-value="I/29: 059" | I/29: 59
| after BWV 30.1, Z 6543 (/6); text by Picander?, Olearius, J. (/6)
| 
|- style="background: #E3F6CE;"
| data-sort-value="0030.206" rowspan="2" | 30.2/6
| chorale setting "Tröstet, tröstet, meine Lieben" (s. 3)
| A maj.
| rowspan="2" | SATB
| data-sort-value="000.05 1: 360" rowspan="2" | 51: 360
| rowspan="2" data-sort-value="III/02 2: 042" | III/2.2: 42
| after Z 6543; text by Olearius, J.
| rowspan="2" | 
|- style="background: #E3F6CE;"
| chorale setting "Freu dich sehr, o meine Seele"
| G maj.
| after Z 6543
|- style="background: #E3F6CE;"
| data-sort-value="0030.100" | 30.1
| data-sort-value="030.002" | 1.
| 1737-09-28
| D maj.
| data-sort-value="satbSATB Trx3 Tmp Flx2 Obx2 Oba Str Bc" | satbSATB 3Tr Tmp 2Fl 2Ob Oba Str Bc
| data-sort-value="000.05 1: 399" | 51: 39934: 325
| data-sort-value="I/39: 051" | I/39: 51
| text by Picander; → BWV 30.2, 195.2/6, /8
| 
|- style="background: #E3F6CE;"
| data-sort-value="0031.200" | 31.2
| data-sort-value="031.002" rowspan="2" | 1.
| rowspan="2" | 1724-04-09
| Cantata Der Himmel lacht! Die Erde jubilieret (Leipzig version: Easter)
| rowspan="2" | C maj.
| data-sort-value="stbSSATB Trx3 Tmp Ob Obax2 Bas Vlx2 Vax2 Bc" | stbSSATB 3Tr Tmp Ob 2Oba Bas 2Vl 2Va Bc
| data-sort-value="000.07: 001" | 7: 1
| data-sort-value="I/09: 041" | I/9: 41
| after BWV 31.1 (same text)
| 
|- style="background: #E3F6CE;"
| data-sort-value="0031.209" | 31/9
| chorale setting "Wenn mein Stündlein vorhanden ist" (s. 5)
| SATB
| data-sort-value="000.07: 050" | 7: 50
| data-sort-value="III/02 1: 078" | III/2.1: 56
| after Z 4482a; text by Herman
| 
|- style="background: #E3F6CE;"
| data-sort-value="0031.100" | 31.1
| data-sort-value="031.003" | 1.
| 1715-04-21
| Cantata Der Himmel lacht! Die Erde jubilieret (Weimar version: Easter)
| C maj.
| data-sort-value="stbSSATB Trx3 Tmp Obx3 Tai Bas Vlx2 Vax2 Bc" | stbSSATB 3Tr Tmp 3Ob Tai Bas 2Vl 2Va Bc
| 
| data-sort-value="I/09" | I/9rev 2: 37
| after Z 4482a (/9); text by Franck, S, Herman (/9); → BWV 31.2
| 
|- style="background: #E3F6CE;"
| data-sort-value="0032.000" | 32
| data-sort-value="032.002" rowspan="3" | 1.
| rowspan="3" | 1726-01-13
| Cantata Liebster Jesu, mein Verlangen (Epiphany I)
| E min.
| sbSATB Ob Str Bc
| data-sort-value="000.07: 053" | 7: 53
| data-sort-value="I/05: 143" | I/5: 143
| after Z 6543 (/6); text by Lehms, Gerhardt (/6)
| 
|- style="background: #E3F6CE;"
| data-sort-value="0032.006" rowspan="2" | 32/6
| chorale setting "Weg, mein Herz, mit den Gedenken" (s. 12)
| rowspan="2" | G maj.
| rowspan="2" | SATB
| data-sort-value="000.07: 080" rowspan="2" | 7: 80
| rowspan="2" data-sort-value="III/02 2: 018" | III/2.2: 18
| after Z 6543; text by Gerhardt
| rowspan="2" | 
|- style="background: #E3F6CE;"
| chorale setting "Freu dich sehr, o meine Seele"
| after Z 6543
|- style="background: #E3F6CE;"
| data-sort-value="0033.000" | 33
| data-sort-value="033.002" rowspan="2" | 1.
| rowspan="2" | 1724-09-03
| Cantata Allein zu dir, Herr Jesu Christ (Trinity XIII)
| rowspan="2" | A min.
| data-sort-value="atbSATB Obx2 Str Bc" | atbSATB 2Ob Str Bc
| data-sort-value="000.07: 081" | 7: 81
| data-sort-value="I/21: 023" | I/21: 23
| after Z 7292b; text after Hubert
| 
|- style="background: #E3F6CE;"
| data-sort-value="0033.006" | 33/6
| chorale setting "Allein zu dir, Herr Jesu Christ" (s. 4)
| SATB
| data-sort-value="000.07: 114" | 7: 114
| data-sort-value="III/02 1: 080" | III/2.1: 58III/2.2: 10
| after Z 7292b; text by Hubert
| 
|- style="background: #E3F6CE;"
| data-sort-value="0034.100" | 34.1
| data-sort-value="034.002" | 1.
| 1727-06-01
| Cantata O ewiges Feuer, o Ursprung der Liebe (Pentecost)
| D maj.
| data-sort-value="atbSATB Trx3 Tmp Flx2 Obx2 Str Bc" | atbSATB 3Tr Tmp 2Fl 2Ob Str Bc
| data-sort-value="000.07: 115" | 7: 115
| I/13: 129
| text after Ps 128:6 (/5); → BWV 34.2
| 
|- style="background: #E3F6CE;"
| data-sort-value="0034.200" | 34.2
| data-sort-value="035.002" | 1.
| data-sort-value="1728-07-01" | after 1727
| Cantata O ewiges Feuer, o Ursprung der Liebe (wedding; incomplete)
| D maj.
| satbSATB Vl Va Bc
| data-sort-value="000.41: 117" | 41: 117
| data-sort-value="I/33: 027" | I/33: 27
| data-sort-value="after BWV 0034.1" | after BWV 34.1; text after Ps 128:4–6 (/3–/4), Nm 6:24–26 (/7)
| 
|- style="background: #E3F6CE;"
| data-sort-value="0035.000" | 35
| data-sort-value="036.002" | 1.
| 1726-09-08
| Cantata Geist und Seele wird verwirret (Trinity XII)
| D min.
| data-sort-value="a Obx2 Tai Str Org Bc" | a 2Ob Tai Str Org Bc
| data-sort-value="000.07: 171" | 7: 171
| I/20: 215
| text by Lehms; → BWV 1059
| 
|- style="background: #F6E3CE;"
| data-sort-value="0036.400" | 36.4
| data-sort-value="037.001" rowspan="2" | 1.
| data-sort-value="1728-07-01" rowspan="2" | 
| Cantata Schwingt freudig euch empor (Advent I; early version)
| rowspan="2" | D maj.
| stbSATB Oba Str Bc
| data-sort-value="000.07: 395" | 7: 395
| data-sort-value="I/01: 017" | I/1: 17
| data-sort-value="after BWV 0036.1" | after BWV 36.1, Z 8359 (/5); text by Picander?, by Nicolai (/5); → BWV 36.5
| 
|- style="background: #F6E3CE;"
| data-sort-value="0036.405" | 36.4/5
| chorale setting "Wie schön leuchtet der Morgenstern" (s. 7)
| SATB
| data-sort-value="000.07: 399" | 7: 399
| data-sort-value="III/02 1: 033" | III/2.1: 28
| after Z 8359; text by Nicolai
| 
|- style="background: #E3F6CE;"
| data-sort-value="0036.500" | 36.5
| data-sort-value="037.002" rowspan="3" | 1.
| rowspan="3" | 1731-12-02
| Cantata Schwingt freudig euch empor (Advent I)
| rowspan="2" | D maj.
| data-sort-value="satbSATB Obax2 Str Bc" | satbSATB 2Oba Str Bc
| data-sort-value="000.07: 221" | 7: 221
| data-sort-value="I/01: 041" | I/1: 41
| data-sort-value="after BWV 0036.4" | after BWV 36.4, Z 1174 (/2, /6, /8), Z 8359 (/4); text by Picander?, by Luther (/2, /6, /8), Nicolai (/4)
| 
|- style="background: #E3F6CE;"
| data-sort-value="0036.504" | 36.5/4
| chorale setting "Wie schön leuchtet der Morgenstern" (s. 6)
| SATB
| data-sort-value="000.07: 243" | 7: 243
| data-sort-value="III/02 2: 048" | III/2.2: 48,109, 180
| after Z 8359; text by Nicolai
| 
|- style="background: #E3F6CE;"
| data-sort-value="0036.508" | 36.5/8
| chorale setting "Nun komm, der Heiden Heiland" (s. 8)
| B min.
| SATB
| data-sort-value="000.07: 258" | 7: 258
| data-sort-value="III/02 2: 018" | III/2.2: 18
| after Z 1174; text by Luther
| 
|- 
| data-sort-value="0036.200" | 36.2
| data-sort-value="039.001" | 1.
| data-sort-value="1725-11-30" | 1726-11-30 or1725-11-30
| Secular cantata Steigt freudig in die Luft (birthday of Charlotte Friederike Wilhelmine of Anhalt-Köthen; music lost)
| 
| stbSATB Oba Va Str Bc (?)
| 
| I/35
| text by Picander; after BWV 36.1/1, /3, /5, /7, /9
| 
|- style="background: #E3F6CE;"
| data-sort-value="0036.300" | 36.3
| data-sort-value="039.002" | 1.
| 1735-07-27
| Secular cantata Die Freude reget sich (birthday of Rivinus, ?)
| D maj.
| satSATB Fl Oba Str Bc
| data-sort-value="000.34: 039" | 34: 39
| I/38: 255
| data-sort-value="after BWV 0036.1/1" | after BWV 36.1/1, /3, /5, /7, /8
| 
|- style="background: #E3F6CE;"
| data-sort-value="0036.100" | 36.1
| data-sort-value="040.002" | 1.
| data-sort-value="1725-04-30" | April–May 1725
| Secular cantata Schwingt freudig euch empor (birthday of ?)
| D maj.
| stbSATB Oba Str Va Bc
| data-sort-value="000.34: 039" | 34: 39
| data-sort-value="I/39: 001" | I/39: 1
| data-sort-value="→ BWV 0036.2" |→ BWV 36.2–.4
| 
|- style="background: #E3F6CE;"
| data-sort-value="0037.000" | 37
| data-sort-value="041.002" rowspan="2" | 1.
| rowspan="2" | 1724-05-18
| Cantata Wer da gläubet und getauft wird (Ascension)
| rowspan="2" | A maj.
| data-sort-value="satbSATB Obax2 Str Bc" | satbSATB 2Oba Str Bc
| data-sort-value="000.07: 259" | 7: 259
| data-sort-value="I/12: 079" | I/12: 79
| after Z 8359 (/3), 5354 (/6); text after Mk 16: 16, by Nicolai (/3), Kolross (/6)
| 
|- style="background: #E3F6CE;"
| data-sort-value="0037.006" | 37/6
| chorale setting "Ich dank dir, lieber Herre" (s. 4)
| SATB
| data-sort-value="000.07: 282" | 7: 282
| data-sort-value="III/02 2: 197" | III/2.2: 197
| after Z 5354; text by Kolross
| 
|- style="background: #E3F6CE;"
| data-sort-value="0038.000" | 38
| data-sort-value="042.002" rowspan="2" | 1.
| rowspan="2" | 1724-10-29
| Cantata Aus tiefer Not schrei ich zu dir (Trinity XXI)
| rowspan="2" | E min.
| data-sort-value="satbSATB Tbnx4 Obx2 Str Bc" | satbSATB 2Ob 4Tbn Str Bc
| data-sort-value="000.07: 283" | 7: 283
| I/25: 217
| after Z 4437; text after Luther
| 
|- style="background: #E3F6CE;"
| data-sort-value="0038.006" | 38/6
| chorale setting "Aus tiefer Not schrei ich zu dir" (s. 5)
| SATB
| data-sort-value="000.07: 300" | 7: 300
| data-sort-value="III/02 1: 094" | III/2.1: 67III/2.2: 8
| after Z 4437; text by Luther
| 
|- style="background: #E3F6CE;"
| data-sort-value="0039.000" | 39
| data-sort-value="043.002" rowspan="3" | 1.
| rowspan="3" | 1726-06-23
| Cantata Brich dem Hungrigen dein Brot (Trinity I)
| G min.
| data-sort-value="sabSATB Flx2 Obx2 Str Bc" | sabSATB 2Fl 2Ob Str Bc
| data-sort-value="000.07: 336" | 7: 336
| I/15 179
| after Z 6543 (/7); text: Meiningen, after Is 58:7–8 (/1), Hb 13:16 (/4), by Denicke (/7)
| 
|- style="background: #E3F6CE;"
| data-sort-value="0039.007" rowspan="2" | 39/7
| chorale setting "Kommt, lasst euch den Herren lehren" (s. 6)
| rowspan="2" | B♭ maj.
| rowspan="2" | SATB
| data-sort-value="000.07: 348" rowspan="2" | 7: 348
| rowspan="2" data-sort-value="III/02 1: 116" | III/2.1: 81III/2.2: 37
| after Z 6543; text by Denicke
| rowspan="2" | 
|- style="background: #E3F6CE;"
| chorale setting "Freu dich sehr, o meine Seele"
| after Z 6543
|- style="background: #E3F6CE;"
| data-sort-value="0040.000" | 40
| data-sort-value="044.002" rowspan="4" | 1.
| rowspan="4" | 1723-12-26
| Cantata Darzu ist erschienen der Sohn Gottes (Christmas 2)
| F maj.
| data-sort-value="atbSATB Hnx2 Obx2 Str Bc" | atbSATB 2Hn 2Ob Str Bc
| data-sort-value="000.07: 349" | 7: 349
| data-sort-value="I/03 1: 003" | I/3.1: 3
| after Z 2072 (/3), 4870 (/6), 7880a (/8); text after 1Jh 3:8 (/1; → BWV 233/6), by Füger (/3), Gerhardt (/6), Keymann (/8)
| 
|- style="background: #E3F6CE;"
| data-sort-value="0040.003" | 40/3
| chorale setting "Wir Christenleut" (s. 3)
| G min.
| SATB
| data-sort-value="000.07: 377" | 7: 377
| data-sort-value="III/02 2: 186" | III/2.2: 186
| after Z 2072; text by Füger
| 
|- style="background: #E3F6CE;"
| data-sort-value="0040.006" | 40/6
| chorale setting "Schwing dich auf zu deinem Gott" (s. 2)
| D min.
| SATB
| data-sort-value="000.07: 387" | 7: 387
| data-sort-value="III/02 2: 082" | III/2.2: 82
| after Z 4870; text by Gerhardt
| 
|- style="background: #E3F6CE;"
| data-sort-value="0040.008" | 40/8
| chorale setting "Freuet euch, ihr Christen alle" (s. 4)
| F min.
| SATB
| data-sort-value="000.07: 394" | 7: 394
| data-sort-value="III/02 2: 006" | III/2.2: 6
| after Z 7880a; text by Keymann
| 
|- style="background: #E3F6CE;"
| data-sort-value="0041.000" | 41
| data-sort-value="045.002" rowspan="2" | 1.
| rowspan="2" | 1725-01-01
| Cantata Jesu, nun sei gepreiset (New Year)
| rowspan="2" | C maj.
| data-sort-value="satbSATB Trx3 Tmp Obx3 Str Vc Bc" | satbSATB 3Tr Tmp 3Ob Str Vc Bc
| data-sort-value="000.10: 001" | 10: 1
| data-sort-value="I/04: 037" | I/4: 37
| after Z 8477a; text after Hermann; /6 → BWV 171/6
| 
|- style="background: #E3F6CE;"
| data-sort-value="0041.006" | 41/6
| chorale setting "Jesu, nun sei gepreiset" (s. 3)
| SATB
| data-sort-value="000.10: 058" | 10: 58
| data-sort-value="III/02 1: 131" | III/2.1: 90III/2.2: 8
| after Z 8477a; text by Hermann
| 
|- style="background: #E3F6CE;"
| data-sort-value="0042.000" | 42
| data-sort-value="046.002" rowspan="2" | 1.
| rowspan="2" | 1725-04-08
| Cantata Am Abend aber desselbigen Sabbats (Quasimodogeniti)
| D maj.
| data-sort-value="satbSATB Obx2 Bas Str Bc" | satbSATB 2Ob Bas Str Bc
| data-sort-value="000.10: 063" | 10: 63
| data-sort-value="I/11 1: 061" | I/11.1: 61
| 
|- style="background: #E3F6CE;"
| data-sort-value="0042.007" | 42/7
| chorale setting "Verleih uns Frieden gnädiglich" (ss. 1–2)
| F♯ min.
| SATB
| data-sort-value="000.10: 091" | 10: 91
| data-sort-value="III/02 1: 020" | III/2.1: 21III/2.2: 51, 154
| after Z 1945b; text by Luther after Da pacem Domine & Walter after 1Tm 2:2
| 
|- style="background: #E3F6CE;"
| data-sort-value="0043.000" | 43
| data-sort-value="047.002" | 1.
| 1726-05-30
| Cantata Gott fähret auf mit Jauchzen (Ascension)
| C maj.
| data-sort-value="satbSATB Trx3 Tmp Obx2 Str Bc" | satbSATB 3Tr Tmp 2Ob Str Bc
| data-sort-value="000.10: 093" | 10: 93
| I/12: 133
| after Z 5741b (/11: by ); text: Meiningen, after Ps 47:6-7 (/1), Mk 16:19 (/4), by Rist (/11)
| 
|- style="background: #E3F6CE;"
| data-sort-value="0044.000" | 44
| data-sort-value="049.001" rowspan="3" | 1.
| rowspan="3" | 1724-05-21
| Cantata Sie werden euch in den Bann tun (Exaudi)
| G min.
| data-sort-value="satbSATB Obx2 Str Bc" | satbSATB 2Ob Str Bc
| data-sort-value="000.10: 127" | 10: 127
| I/12: 165
| data-sort-value="after Z 0533a" | after Z 533a (/4), 2293b (/7); text after Jh 16:2 (/1–2), by Moller (/4), Fleming (/7)
| 
|- style="background: #E3F6CE;"
| rowspan="2" data-sort-value="0044.007" | 44/7
| chorale setting "In allen meinen Taten" (s. 7)
| rowspan="2" | B♭ maj.
| rowspan="2" | SATB
| data-sort-value="000.10: 150" rowspan="2" | 10: 150
| rowspan="2" data-sort-value="III/02 1: 108" | III/2.1: 75III/2.2: 203
| after Z 2293b; text by Fleming
| rowspan="2" | 
|- style="background: #E3F6CE;"
| chorale setting "Nun ruhen alle Wälder"
| after Z 2293b; text by Gerhardt
|- style="background: #E3F6CE;"
| data-sort-value="0045.000" | 45
| data-sort-value="050.001" rowspan="2" | 1.
| rowspan="2" | 1726-08-11
| Cantata Es ist dir gesagt, Mensch, was gut ist (Trinity VIII)
| rowspan="2" | E maj.
| data-sort-value="atbSATB Flx2 Ob Oba Str Bc" | atbSATB 2Fl Ob Oba Str Bc
| data-sort-value="000.10: 151" | 10: 151
| I/18: 197
| after Z 5206b–c (/7); text: Meiningen, after Mh 6:8 (/1), Mt 7:22–23 (/4), by Heermann (/7)
| 
|- style="background: #E3F6CE;"
| data-sort-value="0045.007" | 45/7
| chorale setting "O Gott, du frommer Gott" (s. 7)
| SATB
| data-sort-value="000.10: 186" | 10: 186
| data-sort-value="III/02 2: 047" | III/2.2: 47
| after Z 5206b–c; text by Heermann
| 
|- style="background: #E3F6CE;"
| data-sort-value="0046.000" | 46
| data-sort-value="051.001" rowspan="2" | 1.
| rowspan="2" | 1723-08-01
| Cantata Schauet doch und sehet, ob irgend ein Schmerz sei (Trinity X)
| D min.
| data-sort-value="atbSATB Tdt Hn Flx2 Odcx2 Str Bc" | atbSATB Tdt Hn 2Fl 2Odc Str Bc
| data-sort-value="000.10: 187" | 10: 187
| I/19: 109
| after Z 5105a (/6); text after Lm 1:12 (/1), by Meyfart (/6)
| 
|- style="background: #E3F6CE;"
| data-sort-value="0046.006" | 46/6
| chorale setting "O großer Gott von Macht" (s. 9)
| G min.
| SATB
| data-sort-value="000.10: 236" | 10: 236
| data-sort-value="III/02 2: 045" | III/2.2: 45
| after Z 5105a; text by Meyfart
| 
|- style="background: #E3F6CE;"
| data-sort-value="0047.000" | 47
| data-sort-value="052.001" rowspan="2" | 1.
| rowspan="2" | 1726-10-13
| Cantata Wer sich selbst erhöhet, der soll erniedriget werden (Trinity XVII)
| rowspan="2" | G min.
| data-sort-value="sbSATB Obx2 Str Org Bc" | sbSATB 2Ob Str Org Bc
| data-sort-value="000.10: 239" | 10: 239
| I/23: 319
| after Z 1689a (/5); text by Helbig, after Lk 14:11 (/1)
| 
|- style="background: #E3F6CE;"
| data-sort-value="0047.005" | 47/5
| chorale setting "Warum betrübst du dich, mein Herz" (s. 11)
| SATB
| data-sort-value="000.10: 274" | 10: 274
| data-sort-value="III/02 2: 052" | III/2.2: 52
| after Z 1689a
| 
|- style="background: #E3F6CE;"
| data-sort-value="0048.000" | 48
| data-sort-value="052.002" rowspan="4" | 1.
| rowspan="4" | 1723-10-03
| Cantata Ich elender Mensch, wer wird mich erlösen (Trinity XIX)
| G min.
| data-sort-value="atSATB Tr Obx2 Str Bc" | atSATB Tr 2Ob Str Bc
| data-sort-value="000.10: 275" | 10: 275
| I/24: 105
| 
|- style="background: #E3F6CE;"
| data-sort-value="0048.003" | 48/3
| chorale setting "Ach Gott und Herr" (s. 4)
| B♭ maj.
| SATB
| data-sort-value="000.10: 288" | 10: 288
| data-sort-value="III/02 1: 037" | III/2.1: 30III/2.2: 166
| after Z 2051; text by 
| 
|- style="background: #E3F6CE;"
| data-sort-value="0048.007" rowspan="2" | 48/7
| chorale setting "Herr Jesu Christ, ich schrei zu dir" (s. 12)
| rowspan="2" | G min.
| rowspan="2" | SATB
| data-sort-value="000.10: 298" rowspan="2" | 10: 298
| rowspan="2" data-sort-value="III/02 1: 040" | III/2.1: 33III/2.2: 158
| after Z 4486
| rowspan="2" | 
|- style="background: #E3F6CE;"
| chorale setting "Herr Jesu Christ, du höchstes Gut"
| after Z 4486; text by Ringwaldt
|- style="background: #E3F6CE;"
| data-sort-value="0049.000" | 49
| data-sort-value="053.002" | 1.
| 1726-11-03
| Cantata Ich geh und suche mit Verlangen (Trinity XX)
| G min.
| sb Oba Str Vl Org Bc
| data-sort-value="000.10: 299" | 10: 299
| I/25: 107
| after Z 8359; text by Birkmann, Nicolai & after Jer 31:3, Rv 3:20 (/6); /1 → BWV 1053/3
| 
|- style="background: #F6E3CE;"
| data-sort-value="0050.000" | 50
| data-sort-value="054.002" | 1.
| 
| Cantata Nun ist das Heil und die Kraft (single movement; arrangement or fragment of a cantata for Michaelmas?)
| D maj.
| data-sort-value="SATBx2 Trx3 Tmp Obx3 Str Bc" | 2SATB 3Tr Tmp 3Ob Str Bc
| data-sort-value="000.10: 341" | 10: 341
| I/30: 141
| text after Rv 12:10; in SBB P 136
| 
|- style="background: #E3F6CE;"
| data-sort-value="0051.000" | 51
| data-sort-value="055.001" | 1.
| 1730-09-17
| Cantata Jauchzet Gott in allen Landen (Trinity XV)
| C maj.
| data-sort-value="s Trx2 Tmp Str Bc" | s (2)Tr (Tmp) Str Bc
| data-sort-value="000.12 2: 001" | 122: 1
| data-sort-value="I/22: 077" | I/22: 77
| after Z 8244 (/4); text after Ps 128:2 & 26:2 (/2), by Gramann (/4)
| 
|- style="background: #E3F6CE;"
| data-sort-value="0052.000" | 52
| data-sort-value="055.002" | 1.
| 1726-11-24
| Cantata Falsche Welt, dir trau ich nicht (Trinity XXIII)
| F maj.
| data-sort-value="sSATB Hnx2 Obx3 Bas Str Bc" | sSATB 2Hn 3Ob Bas Str Bc
| data-sort-value="000.12 2: 025" | 122: 25
| I/26: 131
| after BWV 1046a/1 (/1), Z 2461 (/6); text by Birkmann, Reusner (/6)
| 
|- style="background: #F6E3CE;"
| data-sort-value="0054.000" | 54
| data-sort-value="056.003" | 1.
| data-sort-value="1715-12-31" | 1714–1717?
| Cantata Widerstehe doch der Sünde (Oculi)
| E♭ maj.
| data-sort-value="a Vlx2 Vax2 Bc" | a 2Vl 2Va Bc
| data-sort-value="000.12 2: 059" | 122: 59
| data-sort-value="I/18: 003" | I/18: 3
| text by Lehms; → BWV 247/53?
| 
|- style="background: #E3F6CE;"
| data-sort-value="0055.000" | 55
| data-sort-value="057.002" rowspan="2" | 1.
| rowspan="2" | 1726-11-17
| Cantata Ich armer Mensch, ich Sündenknecht (Trinity XXII)
| G min.
| tSATB Fl Oba Str Bc
| data-sort-value="000.12 2: 073" | 122: 73
| data-sort-value="I/26: 055" | I/26: 55
| after Z 6551 (/5); text by Birkmann, Rist (/5)
| 
|- style="background: #E3F6CE;"
| data-sort-value="0055.005" | 55/5
| chorale setting "Werde munter, mein Gemüte" (s. 6)
| B♭ maj.
| SATB
| data-sort-value="000.12 2: 086" | 122: 86
| data-sort-value="III/02 2: 053" | III/2.2: 53
| after Z 6551; text by Rist
| 
|- style="background: #E3F6CE;"
| data-sort-value="0056.000" | 56
| data-sort-value="058.001" rowspan="2" | 1.
| rowspan="2" | 1726-10-27
| Cantata Ich will den Kreuzstab gerne tragen (Trinity XIX)
| G min.
| data-sort-value="bSATB Obx2 Tai Str Vc Bc" | bSATB 2Ob Tai Str Vc Bc
| data-sort-value="000.12 2: 087" | 122: 87
| I/24: 173 
| after Z 6773 (/5); text by Birkmann, Franck, J. (/5)
| 
|- style="background: #E3F6CE;"
| data-sort-value="0056.005" | 56/5
| chorale setting "Du, o schönes Weltgebäude" (s. 6)
| C Dor.
| SATB
| data-sort-value="000.12 2: 104" | 122: 104
| data-sort-value="III/02 2: 048" | III/2.2: 48
| after Z 6773; text by Franck, J.
| 
|- style="background: #E3F6CE;"
| data-sort-value="0057.000" | 57
| data-sort-value="058.002" rowspan="2" | 1.
| rowspan="2" | 1725-12-26
| Cantata Selig ist der Mann (Christmas 2)
| G min.
| data-sort-value="sbSATB Obx2 Tai Str Bc" | sbSATB 2Ob Tai Str Bc
| data-sort-value="000.12 2: 105" | 122: 105
| data-sort-value="I/03 1: 083" | I/3.1: 83 
| after Z 1912a–c (/8); text by Lehms, Fritsch (/8), after Jm 1:12 (/1)
| 
|- style="background: #E3F6CE;"
| data-sort-value="0057.008" | 57/8
| chorale setting "Hast du denn, Jesu, dein Angesicht gänzlich verborgen" (s. 6)
| B♭ maj.
| SATB
| data-sort-value="000.12 2: 132" | 122: 132
| data-sort-value="III/02 2: 050" | III/2.2: 50 
| after Z 1912a–c; text by Fritsch
| 
|- style="background: #E3F6CE;"
| data-sort-value="0058.200" | 58.2
| data-sort-value="059.002" | 1.
| data-sort-value="1733-01-04" | 1733-01-04or1734-01-03
| Cantata Ach Gott, wie manches Herzeleid (New Year I)
| C maj.
| data-sort-value="sb Obx2 Tai Vl Str Bc" | sb 2Ob Tai Vl Str Bc
| data-sort-value="000.12 2: 133" | 122: 133
| data-sort-value="I/04: 217" | I/4: 217 
| data-sort-value="after BWV 0058.1; text by Birkmann" |  after BWV 58.1; text by Birkmann, Moller (/1), Behm (/5)
| 
|- style="background: #E3F6CE;"
| data-sort-value="0058.100" | 58.1
| data-sort-value="060.001" | 1.
| 1727-01-05
| Cantata Ach Gott, wie manches Herzeleid (New Year I; early version)
| C maj.
| sb Vl Str Bc
| 
| data-sort-value="I/04: 241" | I/4: 241 
| data-sort-value="after Z 0533a (/1, 5); text by Birkmann" | after Z 533a (/1, /5); text by Birkmann, Moller (/1), Behm (/5); → BWV 58.2
| 
|- style="background: #E3F6CE;"
| data-sort-value="0059.000" | 59
| data-sort-value="060.002" | 1.
| 1724-05-28
| Cantata Wer mich liebet, der wird mein Wort halten (Pentecost)
| C maj.
| data-sort-value="sbSATB Trx2 Tmp Str Bc" | sbSATB 2Tr Tmp Str Bc
| data-sort-value="000.12 2: 151" | 122: 151
| data-sort-value="I/13: 065" | I/13: 65 
| after Z 7445a (/3); text by Neumeister, Luther (/3), after Jh 14:23 (/1); → BWV 74/1–/2, 175/7
| 
|- style="background: #E3F6CE;"
| data-sort-value="0060.000" | 60
| data-sort-value="061.002" rowspan="2" | 1.
| rowspan="2" | 1723-11-07
| Cantata O Ewigkeit, du Donnerwort (Trinity XXIV)
| D maj.
| data-sort-value="atbSATB Hn Obax2 Str Bc" | atbSATB Hn 2Oba Str Bc
| data-sort-value="000.12 2: 169" | 122: 169
| data-sort-value="I/27: 001" | I/27: 1 
| after Z 5820 (/1), 7173 (/5); text by Rist (/1), Burmeister (/5), after Rv 14:13 (/4)
| 
|- style="background: #E3F6CE;"
| data-sort-value="0060.005" | 60/5
| chorale setting "Es ist genug, so nimm" (s. 5)
| A maj.
| SATB
| data-sort-value="000.12 2: 190" | 122: 190
| data-sort-value="III/02 1: 046" | III/2.1: 37III/2.2: 127
| after Z 7173; text by Burmeister
| 
|- id="NBA I-1" style="background: #E3F6CE;"
| data-sort-value="0061.000" | 61
| data-sort-value="062.001" | 1.
| 1714-12-02
| Cantata Nun komm, der Heiden Heiland (Advent I – first setting)
| A min.
| data-sort-value="stbSATB Fag Vlx2 Vax2 Bc" | stbSATB Fag 2Vl 2Va Bc
| data-sort-value="000.16: 001" | 16: 1
| data-sort-value="I/01: 001" | I/1: 1 
| after Z 1174 (/1), 8359 (/6); text by Neumeister, Luther (/1), Nicolai (/6), after Rv 3:20 (/4)
| 
|- style="background: #E3F6CE;"
| data-sort-value="0062.000" | 62
| data-sort-value="063.001" rowspan="3" | 1.
| rowspan="3" | 1724-12-03
| Cantata Nun komm, der Heiden Heiland (Advent I – second setting)
| rowspan="2" | B min.
| data-sort-value="satbSATB Hn Obx2 Str Bc" | satbSATB Hn 2Ob Str Bc
| data-sort-value="000.16: 019" | 16: 19
| data-sort-value="I/01: 075" | I/1: 75 
| after Z 1174; text after Luther
| 
|- style="background: #E3F6CE;"
| data-sort-value="0062.006" rowspan="2" | 62/6
| rowspan="2" | chorale setting "Nun komm, der Heiden Heiland" (s. 8)
| rowspan="2" | SATB
| data-sort-value="000.16: 050" | 16: 50
| data-sort-value="III/02 1: 096" | III/2.1: 68
| rowspan="2" | after Z 1174; text by Luther
| rowspan="2" | 
|- style="background: #E3F6CE;"
| A min.
| 
| data-sort-value="III/02 2: 097" | III/2.2: 97 
|- style="background: #E3F6CE;"
| data-sort-value="0063.000" | 63
| data-sort-value="064.001" | 1.
| data-sort-value="1714-12-25" | 1714-12-251723-12-25
| Cantata Christen, ätzet diesen Tag (Christmas; two versions)
| C maj.
| data-sort-value="satbSATB Trx4 Tmp Obx3 Bas Str Bc" | satbSATB 4Tr Tmp 3Ob Bas Str Bc
| data-sort-value="000.16: 051" | 16: 51
| data-sort-value="I/02: 001" | I/2: 1 
| text by Heineccius?
| 
|- style="background: #F5F6CE;"
| data-sort-value="0064.000" | 64
| data-sort-value="065.001" rowspan="4" | 1.
| rowspan="4" | 1723-12-27
| Cantata Sehet, welch eine Liebe hat uns der Vater erzeiget (Christmas 3)
| E min.
| data-sort-value="sabSATB Cnt Tbnx3 Oba Str Bc" | sabSATB Cnt 3Tbn Oba Str Bc
| data-sort-value="000.16: 111" | 16: 111, 371
| data-sort-value="I/03 1: 113" | I/3.1: 113
| after Z 1947 (/2), 5206b–c (/4), 8032 (/8); text after , 1Jh 3:1 (/1), by Luther (/2), Kindermann (/4), Franck, J. (/8)
| 
|- style="background: #F5F6CE;"
| data-sort-value="0064.002" | 64/2
| chorale setting "Gelobet seist du, Jesu Christ" (s. 7)
| G maj.
| SATB
| data-sort-value="000.16: 371" | 16: 371
| data-sort-value="III/02 1: 013" | III/2.1: 16III/2.2: 92
| after Z 1947; text by Luther
| 
|- style="background: #F5F6CE;"
| data-sort-value="0064.004" | 64/4
| chorale setting "Was frag ich nach der Welt" (s. 1)
| D maj.
| SATB
| data-sort-value="000.16: 372" | 16: 372
| data-sort-value="III/02 1: 014" | III/2.1: 16III/2.2: 151
| after Z 5206b–c; text by Kindermann
| 
|- style="background: #F5F6CE;"
| data-sort-value="0064.008" | 64/8
| chorale setting "Jesu, meine Freude" (s. 5)
| E min.
| SATB
| data-sort-value="000.16: 132" | 16: 132
| data-sort-value="III/02 1: 012" | III/2.1: 15III/2.2: 80
| after Z 8032; text by Franck, J.
| 
|- style="background: #E3F6CE;"
| data-sort-value="0065.000" | 65
| data-sort-value="066.001" rowspan="5" | 1.
| rowspan="5" | 1724-01-06
| Cantata Sie werden aus Saba alle kommen (Epiphany)
| C maj.
| data-sort-value="tbSATB Hnx2 Flx2 Odcx2 Str Bc" | tbSATB 2Hn 2Fl 2Odc Str Bc
| data-sort-value="000.16: 133" | 16: 133
| data-sort-value="I/05: 001" | I/5: 1 
| data-sort-value="after Z 0192b (/2)" | after Z 192b (/2), 7568 (/7); text after Is 60:6 (/1), by Spangenberg (/2), Gerhardt (/7)
| 
|- style="background: #E3F6CE;"
| data-sort-value="0065.002" rowspan="2" | 65/2
| chorale setting "Ein Kind geboren zu Bethlehem" (s. 4)
| rowspan="2" | A min.
| rowspan="2" | SATB
| data-sort-value="000.16: 152" rowspan="2" | 16: 152
| data-sort-value="III/02 2: 009" rowspan="2" | III/2.2: 9
| data-sort-value="after Z 0192b; text by Spangenberg" | after Z 192b; text by Spangenberg
| rowspan="2" | 
|- style="background: #E3F6CE;"
| chorale setting "Puer natus in Bethlehem"
| data-sort-value="after Z 0192b" | after Z 192b
|- style="background: #E3F6CE;"
| data-sort-value="0065.007" rowspan="2" | 65/7
| chorale setting "Ich hab in Gottes Herz und Sinn" (s. 10)
| rowspan="2" | A min.
| rowspan="2" | SATB
| data-sort-value="000.16: 166" rowspan="2" | 16: 166
| data-sort-value="III/02 2: 024" rowspan="2" | III/2.2: 24
| after Z 7568; text by Gerhardt
| rowspan="2" | 
|- style="background: #E3F6CE;"
| chorale setting "Was mein Gott will, das gscheh allzeit"
| after Z 7568; text by Albert of Prussia
|- style="background: #E3F6CE;"
| data-sort-value="0066.200" | 66.2
| data-sort-value="067.001" rowspan="2" | 1.
| rowspan="2" | 1724-04-10
| Cantata Erfreut euch, ihr Herzen (Easter 2)
| D maj.
| data-sort-value="atbSATB Tr Obx2 Str Bc" | atbSATB Tr 2Ob Str Bc
| data-sort-value="000.16: 167" | 16: 167
| data-sort-value="I/10: 001" | I/10: 1 
| data-sort-value="after BWV 0066.1" | after BWV 66.1/8, /1–/4, Z 8584/3
| 
|- style="background: #E3F6CE;"
| data-sort-value="0066.206" | 66.2/6
| chorale setting "Alleluja", s. 3 from "Christ ist erstanden"
| F♯ min.
| SATB
| data-sort-value="000.16: 214" | 16: 214
| data-sort-value="III/02 1: 079" | III/2.1: 57 
| after Z 8584/3
| 
|-
| data-sort-value="0066.100" | 66.1
| data-sort-value="067.002" | 1.
| 1718-12-10
| Secular cantata Der Himmel dacht auf Anhalts Ruhm und Glück (birthday of Leopold of Anhalt-Köthen)
| 
| data-sort-value="atbSATB Obx2 Bas Str Bc" | atbSATB 2Ob Bas Str Bc (?)
| 
| I/35 
| text by Hunold; → BWV 66.2/1–/5
| 
|- style="background: #E3F6CE;"
| data-sort-value="0067.000" | 67
| data-sort-value="068.002" rowspan="2" | 1.
| rowspan="2" | 1724-04-16
| Cantata Halt im Gedächtnis Jesum Christ (Quasimodogeniti)
| rowspan="2" | A maj.
| data-sort-value="atbSATB Hn Fl Obax2 Str Bc" | atbSATB Hn Fl 2Oba Str Bc
| data-sort-value="000.16: 215" | 16: 215
| data-sort-value="I/11 1: 001" | I/11.1: 1 
| after Z 1743 (/4), 4373 (/7); text after 2Ti 2:8 (/1), Jh 20:19 (/6; → BWV 234/2), by Herman (/4), Ebert (/7)
| 
|- style="background: #E3F6CE;"
| data-sort-value="0067.007" | 67/7
| chorale setting "Du Friedefürst, Herr Jesu Christ" (s. 1)
| SATB
| data-sort-value="000.16: 246" | 16: 246
| data-sort-value="III/02 1: 004" | III/2.1: 10III/2.2: 25 
| after Z 4373; text by Ebert
| 
|- style="background: #E3F6CE;"
| data-sort-value="0068.000" | 68
| data-sort-value="069.002" | 1.
| 1725-05-21
| Cantata Also hat Gott die Welt geliebt (Pentecost 2)
| D min.
| data-sort-value="sbSATB Hn Cnt Tbnx3 Obx2 Tai Str Vc Bc" | sbSATB Hn Cnt 3Tbn 2Ob Tai Str Vc Bc
| data-sort-value="000.16: 247" | 16: 247
| data-sort-value="I/14: 031" | I/14: 31 
| after Z 5920 (/1), BWV 208/13 (/2) and /7 (/4); text by Ziegler, C. M., Liscow (/1), after Jh 3:18 (/5)
| 
|- style="background: #E3F6CE;"
| data-sort-value="0069.200" | 69.2
| data-sort-value="070.002" rowspan="2" | 1.
| rowspan="2" | 1748-08-26
| Cantata Lobe den Herrn, meine Seele (council election)
| rowspan="2" | D maj.
| data-sort-value="satbSATB Trx3 Tmp Obx3 Oba Bas Str Bc" | satbSATB 3Tr Tmp 3Ob Oba Bas Str Bc
| data-sort-value="000.16: 281" | 16: 281
| data-sort-value="I/32 2: 111" | I/32.2: 111 
| data-sort-value="after BWV 0069.1/1" | after BWV 69.1/1, /3, /5, Z 7247 (/6); text after , Ps 103:2 (/1), by Luther (/6)
| 
|- style="background: #E3F6CE;"
| data-sort-value="0069.206" | 69.2/6
| chorale setting "Es woll uns Gott genädig sein" (s. 3)
| SATB
| data-sort-value="000.16: 325" | 16: 325
| data-sort-value="III/02 2: 192" | III/2.2: 192
| after Z 7247; text by Luther
| 
|- style="background: #E3F6CE;"
| data-sort-value="0069.100" | 69.1
| data-sort-value="071.002" rowspan="2" | 1.
| rowspan="2" | 1723-08-15
| Cantata Lobe den Herrn, meine Seele (Trinity XII)
| D maj.
| data-sort-value="satbSATB Trx3 Tmp Fl Obx3 Oba Odc Bas Str Bc" | satbSATB 3Tr Tmp Fl 3Ob Oba Odc Bas Str Bc
| data-sort-value="000.16: 373" | 16: 373
| I/20: 117
| after BWV 12/7 (/6); text after , Ps 103:2 (/1), by Rodigast (/6); → BWV 69.2/1, /3, /5
| 
|- style="background: #E3F6CE;"
| data-sort-value="0069.106" | 69.1/6
| chorale setting "Was Gott tut, das ist wohlgetan" (s. 6)
| G maj.
| SATB
| data-sort-value="000.16: 379" | 16: 379
| data-sort-value="III/02 1: 076" | III/2.1: 55III/2.2: 174
| after BWV 12/7; text by Rodigast
| 
|- style="background: #E3F6CE;"
| data-sort-value="0070.200" | 70.2
| data-sort-value="072.001" rowspan="2" | 1.
| 1723-11-21
| Cantata Wachet! Betet! Betet! Wachet! (Trinity XXVI)
| C maj.
| satbSATB Tr Ob Str Vc Bc
| data-sort-value="000.16: 327" | 16: 327
| I/27: 107 
| after BWV 70.1, Z 6543 (/7); text by Franck, S, Keymann (/11)
| 
|- style="background: #E3F6CE;"
| data-sort-value="0070.211" | 70.2/11
| rowspan="2" | 1716-12-06
| chorale setting "Meinen Jesum laß ich nicht, weil" (s. 5)
| rowspan="2" | C maj.
| SATB
| data-sort-value="000.16: 368" | 16: 368
| data-sort-value="III/02 2: 200" | III/2.2: 200 
| = BWV 70.1/6
| 
|- style="background: #E3F6CE;"
| data-sort-value="0070.100" | 70.1
| data-sort-value="073.002" | 1.
| Cantata Wachet! Betet! Betet! Wachet! (Advent II)
| satbSATB Tr Ob Str Vc Bc
| data-sort-value="000.16: 327" | 16: 327
| data-sort-value="I/01: 076" | I/1 
| after Z 3449 (/6); text by Franck, S, Keymann (/6); → BWV 70.2/1, /3, /5, /8, /10, /11
| 
|- style="background: #E3F6CE;"
| data-sort-value="0071.000" | 71
| data-sort-value="073.003" | 1.
| 1708-02-04
| Cantata Gott ist mein König (council election)
| D maj.
| data-sort-value="satbSATB Trx3 Tmp Flx2 Vc Obx2 Bas Str Vne Org" | satbSATB 3Tr Tmp 2Fl Vc 2Ob Bas Str Vne Org
| data-sort-value="000.18: 001" | 18: 1
| data-sort-value="I/32 1: 003" | I/32.1: 3 
| after Z 5148 (/2); text by Eilmar?, Heermann & after 2Sm 19:35 & 37 (/2), Ps 74:12 (/1), 16–17 (/4), 19 (/6), Dt 33:25 & Gn 21:22b (/3)
| 
|- style="background: #E3F6CE;"
| data-sort-value="0072.000" | 72
| data-sort-value="075.001" | 1.
| 1726-01-27
| Cantata Alles nur nach Gottes Willen (Epiphany III)
| A min.
| data-sort-value="sabSATB Obx2 Str Bc" | sabSATB 2Ob Str Bc
| data-sort-value="000.18: 055" | 18: 55
| data-sort-value="I/06: 059" | I/6: 59 
| after Z 7568 (/6); text by Franck, S, Albert of Prussia (/6); /1 → BWV 235/2
| 
|- style="background: #E3F6CE;"
| data-sort-value="0073.000" | 73
| data-sort-value="075.002" rowspan="2" | 1.
| rowspan="2" | 1724-01-23
| Cantata Herr, wie du willt, so schicks mit mir (Epiphany III)
| G min.
| data-sort-value="stbSATB Hn Obx2 Str Bc" | stbSATB Hn 2Ob Str Bc
| data-sort-value="000.18: 085" | 18: 85
| data-sort-value="I/06: 003" | I/6: 3 
| 
|- style="background: #E3F6CE;"
| data-sort-value="0073.005" | 73/5
| chorale setting "Von Gott will ich nicht lassen" (s. 9)
| C min.A min.
| SATB
| data-sort-value="000.18: 104" | 18: 104
| data-sort-value="III/02 2: 107" | III/2.2: 107
| after Z 5264b; text by Helmbold
| 
|- style="background: #E3F6CE;"
| data-sort-value="0074.000" | 74
| data-sort-value="076.002" rowspan="3" | 1.
| rowspan="3" | 1725-05-20
| Cantata Wer mich liebet, der wird mein Wort halten (Pentecost)
| C maj.
| data-sort-value="satbSATB Trx3 Tmp Obx2 Odc Str Bc" | satbSATB 3Tr Tmp 2Ob Odc Str Bc
| data-sort-value="000.18: 105" | 18: 105
| data-sort-value="I/13: 083" | I/13: 83 
| after BWV 59/1 & /4 (/1–/2), Z 2496 (/8); text by Ziegler, C. M., Gerhardt (/8), after Jh 14:23 (/1), 28 (/4), Rm 8:1 (/6)
| 
|- style="background: #E3F6CE;"
| data-sort-value="0074.008" rowspan="2" | 74/8
| chorale setting "Gott Vater, sende deinen Geist" (s. 2)
| rowspan="2" | A min.
| rowspan="2" | SATB
| data-sort-value="000.18: 146" rowspan="2" | 18: 146
| rowspan="2" data-sort-value="III/02 1: 112" | III/2.1: 78III/2.2: 212
| after Z 2496; text by Gerhardt
| rowspan="2" | 
|- style="background: #E3F6CE;"
| chorale setting "Kommt her zu mir, spricht Gottes Sohn"
| after Z 2496; text by Grünwald
|- style="background: #E3F6CE;"
| data-sort-value="0075.000" | 75
| data-sort-value="077.002" | 1.
| 1723-05-30
| Cantata Die Elenden sollen essen (Trinity I)
| E min.
| data-sort-value="satbSATB Tr Obx2 Oba Bas Str Bc" | satbSATB Tr 2Ob Oba Bas Str Bc
| data-sort-value="000.18: 147" | 18: 147
| data-sort-value="I/15: 085" | I/15: 85 
| after Z 5629 (/7=/14: → BWV 100/6); text after Ps 22:27 (/1), by Rodigast (/7, /14)  
| 
|- style="background: #E3F6CE;"
| data-sort-value="0076.000" | 76
| data-sort-value="079.001" | 1.
| 1723-06-06
| Cantata Die Himmel erzählen die Ehre Gottes (Trinity II)
| C maj.
| data-sort-value="satbSATB Tr Obx2 Oba Str Vdg Bc" | satbSATB Tr 2Ob Oba Str Vdg Bc
| data-sort-value="000.18: 189" | 18: 189
| data-sort-value="I/16: 001" | I/16: 1
| after Z 7247 (/7=/14); text after Ps 12:2 & 4 (/1), by Luther (/7, /14); /8 ↔ BWV 528/1
| 
|- style="background: #E3F6CE;"
| data-sort-value="0077.000" | 77
| data-sort-value="080.002" rowspan="3" | 1.
| rowspan="3" | 1723-08-22
| Cantata Du sollt Gott, deinen Herren, lieben (Trinity XIII)
| C maj.
| data-sort-value="satbSATB Tdt Obx2 Str Bc" | satbSATB Tdt 2Ob Str Bc
| data-sort-value="000.18: 233" | 18: 233
| data-sort-value="I/21: 001" | I/21: 1
| after Z 4431 (/6); text after Knauer, Lk 10:27 (/1), by Denicke? (/6)
| 
|- style="background: #E3F6CE;"
| data-sort-value="0077.006" rowspan="2" | 77/6
| chorale setting "Wenn einer alle Ding verstünd" (s. 8)?
| rowspan="2" | G min.
| rowspan="2" | SATB
| data-sort-value="000.18: 254" rowspan="2" | 18: 254
| rowspan="2" data-sort-value="III/02 1: 010" | III/2.1: 14III/2.2: 150
| after Z 4431; text by Denicke
| rowspan="2" | 
|- style="background: #E3F6CE;"
| chorale setting "Ach Gott, vom Himmel sieh darein"
| after Z 4431; text by Luther
|- style="background: #E3F6CE;"
| data-sort-value="0078.000" | 78
| data-sort-value="081.002" rowspan="2" | 1.
| rowspan="2" | 1724-09-10
| Cantata Jesu, der du meine Seele (Trinity XIV)
| rowspan="2" | G min.
| data-sort-value="satbSATB Hn Fl Obx2 Str Vne Bc" | satbSATB Hn Fl 2Ob Str Vne Bc
| data-sort-value="000.18: 255" | 18: 255
| I/21: 115
| after Z 6804; text after Rist
| 
|- style="background: #E3F6CE;"
| data-sort-value="0078.007" | 78/7
| chorale setting "Jesu, der du meine Seele" (s. 12)
| SATB
| data-sort-value="000.18: 286" | 18: 286
| data-sort-value="III/02 1: 084" | III/2.1: 60III/2.2: 150
| after Z 6804; text by Rist
| 
|- style="background: #E3F6CE;"
| data-sort-value="0079.000" | 79
| data-sort-value="082.002" | 1.
| 1725-10-31
| Cantata Gott der Herr ist Sonn und Schild (Reformation Day; two versions: Fl associated with 2nd 1730)
| G maj.
| data-sort-value="sabSATB Hnx2 Tmp Flx2 Obx2 Str Bc" | sabSATB 2Hn Tmp (2Fl) 2Ob Str Bc
| data-sort-value="000.18: 287" | 18: 287
| data-sort-value="I/31: 001" | I/31: 1
| after Z 5142 (/3), 159 (/6); text after Ps 84:12 (/1), by Rinkart (/3), Helmbold (/6); → BWV 236/2, /4, 234/5
| 
|- style="background: #F5F6CE;"
| data-sort-value="0080.300" | 80.3
| data-sort-value="083.002" | 1.
| data-sort-value="1735-10-31" | ?
| Cantata Ein feste Burg ist unser Gott (Reformation Day; 2nd Leipzig v.; Tr & Tmp in BGA likely W. F. Bach's addition)
| D maj.
| data-sort-value="satbSATB Obx3 Obax2 Odc Str Bc" | satbSATB 3Ob 2Oba Odc Str Bc
| data-sort-value="000.18: 317" | 18: 317
| data-sort-value="I/31: 071" | I/31: 71
| after BWV 80.2 (same text)
| 
|-
| data-sort-value="0080.100" | 80.1
| data-sort-value="085.001" | 1.
| 1715-03-24
| Cantata Alles, was von Gott geboren (Oculi; music lost)
| 
| data-sort-value="satbSATB Ob Str Bc" | satb(?)SATB Ob Str Bc
| 
| data-sort-value="I/08 2: 000" | I/8.2: V
| after Z 7377 (/1, /6)?; text by Franck, S, Luther (/6); → BWV 80.2
| 
|- style="background: #E3F6CE;"
| data-sort-value="0080.200" | 80.2
| data-sort-value="085.002" rowspan="2" | 1.
| data-sort-value="1730-10-31" rowspan="2" | 
| Cantata Ein feste Burg ist unser Gott (Reformation Day; 1st Leipzig version)
| rowspan="2" | D maj.
| data-sort-value="sbSATB Ob Str Bc" | sbSATB Ob Str Bc
| data-sort-value="000.18: 351" | 18: 351
| data-sort-value="I/31: 065" | I/31: 65
| after Z 7377, BWV 80.1 (/2–/4, /6–/7); text by Franck, S, Luther (/1, /2, /5, /8); → BWV 80.3
| 
|- style="background: #E3F6CE;"
| data-sort-value="0080.208" | 80/8
| chorale setting "Ein feste Burg ist unser Gott" (s. 4)
| SATB
| data-sort-value="000.18: 378" | 18: 378
| data-sort-value="III/02 1: 035" | III/2.1: 29III/2.2: 162
| after Z 7377; text by Luther
| 
|- style="background: #E3F6CE;"
| data-sort-value="0081.000" | 81
| data-sort-value="085.003" rowspan="2" | 1.
| rowspan="2" | 1724-01-30
| Cantata Jesus schläft, was soll ich hoffen? (Epiphany IV)
| rowspan="2" | E min.
| data-sort-value="atbSATB Flx2 Obax2 Str Bc" | atbSATB 2Fl 2Oba Str Bc
| data-sort-value="000.20 1: 001" | 201: 1
| data-sort-value="I/06: 111" | I/6: 111
| after Z 8032 (/7); text after Ps 10:1 (/2), Mt 8:26 (/4), by Franck, J. (/7)
| 
|- style="background: #E3F6CE;"
| data-sort-value="0081.007" | 81/7
| chorale setting "Jesu, meine Freude" (s. 2)
| SATB
| data-sort-value="000.20 1: 024" | 201: 24
| data-sort-value="III/02 2: 188" | III/2.2: 188
| after Z 8032; text by Franck, J.
| 
|- style="background: #E3F6CE;"
| data-sort-value="0082.100" | 82.1
| data-sort-value="086.002" | 1.
| 1727-02-02
| Cantata Ich habe genug (Purification; 1st version)
| C min.
| b Ob Str Bc
| data-sort-value="000.20 1: 025" | 201: 25
| data-sort-value="I/28 1: 077" | I/28.1: 77
| text by Birkmann; → BWV 82.2–.4
| 
|- style="background: #E3F6CE;"
| data-sort-value="0082.200" | 82.2
| data-sort-value="086.003" | 1.
| 1731-02-02
| Cantata Ich habe genug (Purification; 2nd version)
| E min.
| s Fl Str Bc
| 
| data-sort-value="I/28 1: 155" | I/28.1: 155
| data-sort-value="after BWV 0082.1" | after BWV 82.1 (same text); → 82.3–.4
| 
|- style="background: #F5F6CE;"
| data-sort-value="0082.202" | 82.2/2–/3
| data-sort-value="086.004" | 1.
| data-sort-value="1731-07-01" | 1731 (AMB)
| data-sort-value="Notebook A. M. Bach (1725) No. 34" | Notebook A. M. Bach (1725) No. 34 Recitative "Ich habe genug"; Aria "Schlummert ein, ihr matten Augen"
| E min.
| s Bc
| data-sort-value="000.43 2: 046" | 432: 46
| data-sort-value="V/04: 124" |  V/4:122
| data-sort-value="after BWV 0082.2" | after BWV 82.2; text by Birkmann
| 
|- style="background: #F5F6CE;"
| data-sort-value="0082.203" | 82.2/3
| data-sort-value="086.005" | 1.
| data-sort-value="1731-07-01" | 1731 (AMB)
| data-sort-value="Notebook A. M. Bach (1725) No. 38" | Notebook A. M. Bach (1725) No. 38 Aria "Schlummert ein, ihr matten Augen" (incomplete)
| E min.
| s Bc
| data-sort-value="000.43 2: 049" | 432: 49
| data-sort-value="V/04: 128" |  V/4:122
| data-sort-value="after BWV 0082.2" | after BWV 82.2; text by Birkmann
| 
|-
| data-sort-value="0082.300" | 82.3
| data-sort-value="086.006" | 1.
| data-sort-value="1735-02-02" | 1735
| Cantata Ich habe genug (Purification; 3rd version)
| C min.
| data-sort-value="b or mezzo Ob Str Bc" | b or mezzo Ob Str Bc
| 
| data-sort-value="I/28 1: 109" | I/28.1: 109
| data-sort-value="after BWV 0082.1–.2" | after BWV 82.1–.2 (same text); → 82.4
| 
|- style="background: #E3F6CE;"
| data-sort-value="0082.400" | 82.4
| data-sort-value="086.007" | 1.
| data-sort-value="1747-02-02" | 1746–1748
| Cantata Ich habe genug (Purification; 4th version)
| C min.
| data-sort-value="b or mezzo Ob Odc Str Bc" | b (or mezzo) Ob Odc Str Bc
| 
| data-sort-value="I/28 1: 111" | I/28.1: 109
| data-sort-value="after BWV 0082.1–.3" | after BWV 82.1–.3 (same text)
| 
|- style="background: #E3F6CE;"
| data-sort-value="0083.000" | 83
| data-sort-value="087.002" rowspan="2" | 1.
| rowspan="2" | 1724-02-02
| Cantata Erfreute Zeit im neuen Bunde (Purification)
| F maj.
| data-sort-value="atbSATB Hnx2 Obx2 Vl Str Bc" | atbSATB 2Hn 2Ob Vl Str Bc
| data-sort-value="000.20 1: 051" | 201: 51
| data-sort-value="I/28 1: 003" | I/28.1: 3
| after Z 3986 (/5); text after Lk 2:29-31 (/2), Hb 4:16 (/3), by Luther (/5)
| 
|- style="background: #E3F6CE;"
| data-sort-value="0083.005" | 83/5
| chorale setting "Mit Fried und Freud ich fahr dahin" (s. 4)
| D min.
| SATB
| data-sort-value="000.20 1: 076" | 201: 76
| data-sort-value="III/02 2: 188" | III/2.2: 188
| after Z 3986; text by Luther
| 
|- style="background: #E3F6CE;"
| data-sort-value="0084.000" | 84
| data-sort-value="088.002" rowspan="3" | 1.
| rowspan="3" | 1727-02-09
| Cantata Ich bin vergnügt mit meinem Glücke (Septuagesimae)
| E min.
| sSATB Ob Str Bc
| data-sort-value="000.20 1: 077" | 201: 77
| data-sort-value="I/07: 021" | I/7: 21
| after Z 2778 (/5); text after Picander, by E. J. of Schwarzburg-Rudolstadt (/5)
| 
|- style="background: #E3F6CE;"
| data-sort-value="0084.005" rowspan="2" | 84/5
| chorale setting "Wer weiß, wie nahe mir mein Ende" (s. 12)
| rowspan="2" | B min.
| rowspan="2" | SATB
| data-sort-value="000.20 1: 098" rowspan="2" | 201: 98
| rowspan="2" data-sort-value="III/02 1: 030" | III/2.1: 27III/2.2: 63
| after Z 2778; text by E. J. of Schwarzburg-Rudolstadt
| rowspan="2" | 
|- style="background: #E3F6CE;"
| chorale setting "Wer nur den lieben Gott lässt walten"
| after Z 2778; text by Neumark
|- style="background: #E3F6CE;"
| data-sort-value="0085.000" | 85
| data-sort-value="089.001" rowspan="2" | 1.
| rowspan="2" | 1725-04-15
| Cantata Ich bin ein guter Hirt (Misericordias Domini)
| rowspan="2" | C min.
| data-sort-value="satbSATB Obx2 Str Vc Bc" | satbSATB 2Ob Str Vc Bc
| data-sort-value="000.20 1: 099" | 201: 99
| data-sort-value="I/11 1: 157" | I/11.1: 157
| after Z 4457 (/3), 2542 (/6); text after Jh 10:12 (/1), by Becker (/3),  (/6)
| 
|- style="background: #E3F6CE;"
| data-sort-value="0085.006" | 85/6
| chorale setting "Ist Gott mein Schild und Helfersmann" (s. 4)
| SATB
| data-sort-value="000.20 1: 118" | 201: 118
| data-sort-value="III/02 1: 106" | III/2.1: 74III/2.2: 69
| after Z 2542; text by 
| 
|- style="background: #E3F6CE;"
| data-sort-value="0086.000" | 86
| data-sort-value="089.002" rowspan="2" | 1.
| rowspan="2" | 1724-05-14
| Cantata Wahrlich, wahrlich, ich sage euch (Rogate)
| rowspan="2" | E maj.
| data-sort-value="satbSATB Obax2 Str Bc" | satbSATB 2Oba Str Bc
| data-sort-value="000.20 1: 119" | 201: 119
| data-sort-value="I/12: 045" | I/12: 45
| after Z 2496c (/3), 4430 (/6); text after Jh 16:23 (/1), by Grünwald (/3), Speratus (/6)
| 
|- style="background: #E3F6CE;"
| data-sort-value="0086.006" | 86/6
| chorale setting "Es ist das Heil uns kommen her" (s. 11)
| SATB
| data-sort-value="000.20 1: 134" | 201: 134
| data-sort-value="III/02 2: 003" | III/2.2: 3
| after Z 4430; text by Speratus
| 
|- style="background: #E3F6CE;"
| data-sort-value="0087.000" | 87
| data-sort-value="090.002" rowspan="3" | 1.
| rowspan="3" | 1725-05-06
| Cantata Bisher habt ihr nichts gebeten in meinem Namen (Rogate)
| rowspan="3" | D min.
| data-sort-value="atbSATB Obx2 Odcx2 Str Bc" | atbSATB 2Ob 2Odc Str Bc
| data-sort-value="000.20 1: 135" | 201: 135
| data-sort-value="I/12: 061" | I/12: 61
| after Z 8032 (/7); text after Ziegler, C. M., Jh 16:24 (/1), by Müller, H. (/7)
| 
|- style="background: #E3F6CE;"
| data-sort-value="0087.007" rowspan="2" | 87/7
| chorale setting "Selig ist die Seele" (s. 9)
| rowspan="2" | SATB
| data-sort-value="000.20 1: 152" rowspan="2" | 201: 152
| rowspan="2" data-sort-value="III/02 1: 105" | III/2.1: 73III/2.2: 54
| after Z 8032; text by Müller, H.
| rowspan="2" | 
|- style="background: #E3F6CE;"
| chorale setting "Jesu, meine Freude"
| after Z 8032; text by Franck, J.
|- style="background: #E3F6CE;"
| data-sort-value="0088.000" | 88
| data-sort-value="091.002" rowspan="2" | 1.
| rowspan="2" | 1726-07-21
| Cantata Siehe, ich will viel Fischer aussenden (Trinity V)
| D maj.
| data-sort-value="satbSATB Hnx2 Obax2 Tai Str Bc" | satbSATB 2Hn 2Oba Tai Str Bc
| data-sort-value="000.20 1: 153" | 201: 153
| data-sort-value="I/17 2: 033" | I/17.2: 33
| after Z 2778 (/7); text: Meiningen, after Jer 16:16 (/1), Lk 5:10 (/4), by Neumark (/7)
| 
|- style="background: #E3F6CE;"
| data-sort-value="0088.007" | 88/7
| chorale setting "Wer nur den lieben Gott lässt walten" (s. 7)
| B min.
| SATB
| data-sort-value="000.20 1: 178" | 201: 178
| data-sort-value="III/02 2: 058" | III/2.2: 58
| after Z 2778; text by Neumark
| 
|- style="background: #E3F6CE;"
| data-sort-value="0089.000" | 89
| data-sort-value="092.002" rowspan="2" | 1.
| rowspan="2" | 1723-10-24
| Cantata Was soll ich aus dir machen, Ephraim? (Trinity XXII)
| C min.
| data-sort-value="sabSATB Hn Obx2 Str Bc" | sabSATB Hn 2Ob Str Bc
| data-sort-value="000.20 1: 179" | 201: 179
| data-sort-value="I/26: 001" | I/26: 1
| after Z 2164 (/6); text after Hs 11:8 (/1), by Heermann (/6)
| 
|- style="background: #E3F6CE;"
| data-sort-value="0089.006" | 89/6
| chorale setting "Wo soll ich fliehen hin" (s. 7)
| G min.
| SATB
| data-sort-value="000.20 1: 194" | 201: 194
| data-sort-value="III/02 2: 167" | III/2.2: 167
| after Z 2164; text by Heermann
| 
|- style="background: #E3F6CE;"
| data-sort-value="0090.000" | 90
| data-sort-value="093.002" rowspan="3" | 1.
| rowspan="3" | 1723-11-14
| Cantata Es reißet euch ein schrecklich Ende (Trinity XXV)
| rowspan="3" | D min.
| data-sort-value="atbSATB Tr Str Bc" | atbSATB (Tr) Str Bc
| data-sort-value="000.20 1: 195" | 201: 195
| data-sort-value="I/27: 059" | I/27: 59
| after Z 2561 (/5); text by Moller (/5)
| 
|- style="background: #E3F6CE;"
| data-sort-value="0090.005" rowspan="2" | 90/5
| chorale setting "Nimm von uns, Herr, du treuer Gott" (s. 7)
| rowspan="2" | SATB
| data-sort-value="000.20 1: 214" rowspan="2" | 201: 214
| rowspan="2" data-sort-value="III/02 1: 041" | III/2.1: 33III/2.2: 158
| after Z 2561; text by Moller
| rowspan="2" | 
|- style="background: #E3F6CE;"
| chorale setting "Vater unser im Himmelreich"
| after Z 2561; text by Luther
|- style="background: #E3F6CE;"
| data-sort-value="0091.200" | 91.2
| data-sort-value="094.000" | 1.
| data-sort-value="1747-06-25" | 1746–1747
| Cantata Gelobet seist du, Jesu Christ (Christmas; later version)
| G maj.
| data-sort-value="satbSATB Hnx2 Tmp Obx3 Str Bc" | satbSATB 2Hn Tmp 3Ob Str Bc
| data-sort-value="000.22: 001" | 22: 1
| data-sort-value="I/02: 131" | I/2: 131
| data-sort-value="after BWV 0091" | after BWV 91.1 (same text)
| 
|- style="background: #E3F6CE;"
| data-sort-value="0091.100" | 91.1
| data-sort-value="094.001" rowspan="2" | 1.
| rowspan="2" | 1724-12-25
| Cantata Gelobet seist du, Jesu Christ (Christmas; early version)
| rowspan="2" | G maj.
| data-sort-value="satbSATB Hnx2 Tmp Obx3 Str Bc" | satbSATB 2Hn Tmp 3Ob Str Bc
| data-sort-value="000.22: 001, 333" | 22: 1,333
| data-sort-value="I/02: 164" | I/2: 164
| after Z 1947; text after Luther; → BWV 91.2
| 
|- style="background: #E3F6CE;"
| data-sort-value="0091.106" | 91/6
| chorale setting "Gelobet seist du, Jesu Christ" (s. 7)
| SATB
| 
| data-sort-value="III/02 1: 130" | III/2.1: 89III/2.2: 30
| after Z 1947; text by Luther
| 
|- style="background: #E3F6CE;"
| data-sort-value="0092.000" | 92
| data-sort-value="094.002" | 1.
| 1725-01-28
| Cantata Ich hab in Gottes Herz und Sinn (Septuagesimae)
| B min.
| data-sort-value="satbSATB Obax2 Str Bc" | satbSATB 2Oba Str Bc
| data-sort-value="000.22: 033" | 22: 33
| data-sort-value="I/07: 041" | I/7: 41
| after Z 7568; text after Gerhardt
| 
|- style="background: #E3F6CE;"
| data-sort-value="0093.000" | 93
| data-sort-value="096.001" | 1.
| 1724-07-09
| Cantata Wer nur den lieben Gott läßt walten (Trinity V)
| C min.
| data-sort-value="satbSATB Obx2 Str Bc" | satbSATB 2Ob Str Bc
| data-sort-value="000.22: 069" | 22: 69
| data-sort-value="I/17 2: 003" | I/17.2: 3
| after Z 2778; text after Neumark; /4 → BWV 647
| 
|- style="background: #E3F6CE;"
| data-sort-value="0094.000" | 94
| data-sort-value="097.001" rowspan="2" | 1.
| rowspan="2" | 1724-08-06
| Cantata Was frag ich nach der Welt (Trinity IX)
| rowspan="2" | D maj.
| data-sort-value="satbSATB Fl Obx2 Obax2 Str Bc" | satbSATB Fl 2Ob 2Oba Str Bc
| data-sort-value="000.22: 095" | 22: 95
| data-sort-value="I/19: 043" | I/19: 43
| after Z 5206b–c; text after Kindermann
| 
|- style="background: #E3F6CE;"
| data-sort-value="0094.008" | 94/8
| chorale setting "Was frag ich nach der Welt" (s. 8)
| SATB
| data-sort-value="000.22: 127" | 22: 127
| data-sort-value="III/02 1: 072" | III/2.1: 53III/2.2: 173
| after Z 5206b–c; text by Kindermann
| 
|- style="background: #E3F6CE;"
| data-sort-value="0095.000" | 95
| data-sort-value="098.001" rowspan="2" | 1.
| rowspan="2" | 1723-09-12
| Cantata Christus, der ist mein Leben (Trinity XVI)
| rowspan="2" | G maj.
| data-sort-value="stbSATB Hn Cnt Obx2 Obax2 Str Bc" | stbSATB Hn or Cnt 2Ob 2Oba Str Bc
| data-sort-value="000.22: 129" | 22: 129
| data-sort-value="I/23: 065" | I/23: 65
| data-sort-value="after Z 0132 & 3986 (/1: → BWV 0282)" | after Z 132 & 3986 (/1: → BWV 282), 5404a (/3), 4482 (/7); text by  & Luther (/1), Herberger (/3), Herman (/7)
| 
|- style="background: #E3F6CE;"
| data-sort-value="0095.007" | 95/7
| chorale setting "Wenn mein Stündlein vorhanden ist" (s. 4)
| SATB
| data-sort-value="000.22: 153" | 22: 153
| data-sort-value="III/02 1: 089" | III/2.1: 64
| after Z 4482; text by Herman
| 
|- style="background: #E3F6CE;"
| data-sort-value="0096.000" | 96
| data-sort-value="099.002" rowspan="2" | 1.
| rowspan="2" | 1724-10-08
| Cantata Herr Christ, der einge Gottessohn (Trinity XVIII)
| rowspan="2" | F maj.
| data-sort-value="satbSATB Hn Tbn Flx2 Vl Obx2 Str Bc" | satbSATB Hn or Tbn Fl/Fl or Vl 2Ob Str Bc
| data-sort-value="000.22: 155" | 22: 155
| data-sort-value="I/24: 001" | I/24: 1
| after Z 4297a; text after Cruciger
| 
|- style="background: #E3F6CE;"
| data-sort-value="0096.006" | 96/6
| chorale setting "Herr Christ, der einge Gottessohn" (s. 5)
| SATB
| data-sort-value="000.22: 184" | 22: 184
| data-sort-value="III/02 1: 092" | III/2.1: 66III/2.2: 179
| after Z 4297a; text by Cruciger
| 
|- style="background: #E3F6CE;"
| data-sort-value="0097.000" | 97
| data-sort-value="100.001" rowspan="3" | 1.
| data-sort-value="1734-07-25" rowspan="3" | 1734-07-25?after 1735
| Cantata In allen meinen Taten (two versions; Trinity V?)
| rowspan="3" | B♭ maj.
| data-sort-value="satbSATB Obx2 Str Bc" | satbSATB 2Ob Str Bc
| data-sort-value="000.22: 185" | 22: 185, 336
| I/34: 197
| after Z 2293b; text by Fleming; /9 → BWV 392
| 
|- style="background: #E3F6CE;"
| data-sort-value="0097.009" rowspan="2" | 97/9
| chorale setting "In allen meinen Taten" (s. 9)
| rowspan="2" | SATB
| data-sort-value="000.22: 230" rowspan="2" | 22: 230
| rowspan="2" data-sort-value="III/02 1: 066" | III/2.1: 49
| after Z 2293b; text by Fleming; → BWV 392
| rowspan="2" | 
|- style="background: #E3F6CE;"
| chorale setting "Nun ruhen alle Wälder"
| after Z 2293b; text by Gerhardt; → BWV 392
|- style="background: #E3F6CE;"
| data-sort-value="0098.000" | 98
| data-sort-value="101.001" | 1.
| 1726-11-10
| Cantata Was Gott tut, das ist wohlgetan (Trinity XXI)
| B♭ maj.
| data-sort-value="satbSATB Obx2 Str Bc" | satbSATB 2Ob Str Bc
| data-sort-value="000.22: 231" | 22: 231
| I/25: 241
| after Z 5629 (/1); text by Birkmann, Rodigast (/1)
| 
|- style="background: #E3F6CE;"
| data-sort-value="0099.000" | 99
| data-sort-value="102.001" | 1.
| 1724-09-17
| Cantata Was Gott tut, das ist wohlgetan (Trinity XV)
| G maj.
| satbSATB Hn Fl Oba Str Bc
| data-sort-value="000.22: 251" | 22: 251
| data-sort-value="I/22: 041" | I/22: 41
| after Z 5629; text after Rodigast; /1 → BWV 100/1
| 
|- style="background: #E3F6CE;"
| data-sort-value="0100.000" | 100
| data-sort-value="102.002" rowspan="2" | 1.
| data-sort-value="1734-12-31" rowspan="2" | 1734–1735
| Cantata Was Gott tut, das ist wohlgetan
| rowspan="2" | G maj.
| data-sort-value="satbSATB Hnx2 Tmp Fl Oba Str Bc" | satbSATB 2Hn Tmp Fl Oba Str Bc
| data-sort-value="000.22: 277" | 22: 277
| I/34: 239
| after Z 5629, BWV 99/1 (/1), 75/7 (/6); text by Rodigast
| 
|- style="background: #E3F6CE;"
| data-sort-value="0100.006" | 100/6
| chorale setting "Was Gott tut, das ist wohlgetan" (s. 6)
| SATB
| data-sort-value="000.22: 323" | 22: 323
| data-sort-value="III/02 1: 103" | III/2.1: 72
| data-sort-value="after BWV 0075/7=/14" | after 75/7=/14; text by Rodigast
| 
|- style="background: #E3F6CE;"
| data-sort-value="0101.000" | 101
| data-sort-value="103.002" rowspan="2" | 1.
| rowspan="2" | 1724-08-13
| Cantata Nimm von uns, Herr, du treuer Gott (Trinity X)
| rowspan="2" | D min.
| data-sort-value="satbSATB Hnx2 Tmp Fl Oba Str Bc" | satbSATB 2Hn Tmp Fl Oba Str Bc
| data-sort-value="000.23: 001" | 23: 1
| I/19: 173
| after Z 2561; text after Moller
| 
|- style="background: #E3F6CE;"
| data-sort-value="0101.007" | 101/7
| chorale setting "Nimm von uns, Herr, du treuer Gott" (s. 7)
| SATB
| data-sort-value="000.23: 032" | 23: 32
| data-sort-value="III/02 1: 073" | III/2.1: 54III/2.2: 174
| after Z 2561; text by Moller
| 
|- style="background: #E3F6CE;"
| data-sort-value="0102.000" | 102
| data-sort-value="105.001" rowspan="3" | 1.
| rowspan="3" | 1726-08-25
| Cantata Herr, deine Augen sehen nach dem Glauben (Trinity X)
| G min.
| data-sort-value="atbSATB Fl Vl Obx2 Str Bc" | atbSATB Fl Vl 2Ob Str Bc
| data-sort-value="000.23: 033" | 23: 33
| I/19: 229
| after Z 2561 (/7); text: Meiningen, after Jer 5:3 (/1: → BWV 235/1), Rm 2:4–5 (/4), by Heermann (/7); /3 & /5 → BWV 233/4 & /5
| 
|- style="background: #E3F6CE;"
| data-sort-value="0102.007" rowspan="2" | 102/7
| chorale setting "So wahr ich lebe, spricht dein Gott" (ss. 6–7)
| rowspan="2" | C min.
| rowspan="2" | SATB
| data-sort-value="000.23: 066" rowspan="2" | 23: 66
| rowspan="2" data-sort-value="III/02 2: 062" | III/2.2: 62
| after Z 2561; text by Heermann
| rowspan="2" | 
|- style="background: #E3F6CE;"
| chorale setting "Vater unser im Himmelreich"
| after Z 2561; text by Luther
|- style="background: #E3F6CE;"
| data-sort-value="0103.000" | 103
| data-sort-value="106.001" rowspan="4" | 1.
| data-sort-value="1725-04-22" rowspan="4" | 1725-04-221731-04-15
| Cantata Ihr werdet weinen und heulen (Jubilate, 2 versions)
| rowspan="4" | B min.
| data-sort-value="atSATB Tr Fl Fl Vl Obax2 Str Bc" | atSATB Tr Fl Fl (or) Vl 2Oba Str Bc
| data-sort-value="000.23: 067" | 23: 67
| data-sort-value="I/11 2: 025" | I/11.2: 25
| after Z 7568 (/6); text by Ziegler, C. M., Gerhardt (/6)
| 
|- style="background: #E3F6CE;"
| data-sort-value="0103.006" rowspan="3" | 103/6
| chorale setting "Barmherzger Vater, höchster Gott" (s. 9)
| rowspan="3" | SATB
| data-sort-value="000.23: 094" rowspan="3" | 23: 94
| rowspan="3" data-sort-value="III/02 1: 102" | III/2.1: 72III/2.2: 68
| rowspan="2" | after Z 7568; text by Gerhardt
| rowspan="3" | 
|- style="background: #E3F6CE;"
| chorale setting "Ich hab in Gottes Herz und Sinn"
|- style="background: #E3F6CE;"
| chorale setting "Was mein Gott will, das gscheh allzeit"
| after Z 7568; text by Albert of Prussia
|- style="background: #E3F6CE;"
| data-sort-value="0104.000" | 104
| data-sort-value="106.002" rowspan="4" | 1.
| rowspan="4" | 1724-04-23
| Cantata Du Hirte Israel, höre (Misericordias)
| G maj.
| data-sort-value="tbSATB Obx2 Obax2 Tai Str Bc" | tbSATB 2Ob 2Oba Tai Str Bc
| data-sort-value="000.23: 095" | 23: 95
| data-sort-value="I/11 1: 113" | I/11.1: 113
| after Z 4457 (/6); text after Ps 80:2 (/1), by Becker (/6)
| 
|- style="background: #E3F6CE;"
| data-sort-value="0104.006" rowspan="3" | 104/6
| chorale setting "Der Herr ist mein getreuer Hirt" (s. 1)
| rowspan="2" | A maj.
| rowspan="3" | SATB
| data-sort-value="000.23: 116" rowspan="2" | 23: 116
| rowspan="2" data-sort-value="III/02 2: 189" | III/2.2: 189
| after Z 4457; text by Becker
| rowspan="2" | 
|- style="background: #E3F6CE;"
| rowspan="2" | chorale setting "Allein Gott in der Höh sei Ehr"
| rowspan="2" | after Z 4457; text by Decius
|- style="background: #E3F6CE;"
| G maj.
| 
| data-sort-value="III/02 2: 071" | III/2.2: 71
| 
|- style="background: #E3F6CE;"
| data-sort-value="0105.000" | 105
| data-sort-value="107.002" rowspan="2" | 1.
| rowspan="2" | 1723-07-25
| Cantata Herr, gehe nicht ins Gericht mit deinem Knecht (Trinity IX)
| rowspan="2" | G min.
| data-sort-value="satbSATB Hn Obx2 Str Bc" | satbSATB Hn 2Ob Str Bc
| data-sort-value="000.23: 117" | 23: 117
| data-sort-value="I/19: 001" | I/19: 1
| after Z 6804 (/6); text after Ps 143:2 (/1), by Rist (/6)
| 
|- style="background: #E3F6CE;"
| data-sort-value="0105.006" | 105/6
| chorale setting "Jesu, der du meine Seele" (s. 11)
| SATB
| data-sort-value="000.23: 146" | 23: 146
| data-sort-value="III/02 1: 071" | III/2.1: 52
| after Z 6804; text by Rist
| 
|-
| data-sort-value="0106.000" | 106
| data-sort-value="108.002" | 1.
| data-sort-value="1708-09-16" | 1708-09-16?
| Cantata Gottes Zeit ist die allerbeste Zeit (funeral; aka Actus tragicus)
| E♭ maj.
| data-sort-value="satbSATB Flx2 Vdgx2 Bc" | satbSATB 2Fl 2Vdg Bc
| data-sort-value="000.23: 147" | 23: 147
| data-sort-value="I/34: 001" | I/34: 1
| after Z 1680 (/2d), 3986 (/3b), 2461 (/4); text after Olearius, J., Acts 17:28 & Ps 90:12 & Is 38:1 & JS 14:18 & Rv 22:20 (/2), Ps 31:6 & Lk 23:43 & by Luther (/3), Reusner (/4)
| 
|- style="background: #E3F6CE;"
| data-sort-value="0107.000" | 107
| data-sort-value="109.002" | 1.
| 1724-07-23
| Cantata Was willst du dich betrüben (Trinity VII)
| B min.
| data-sort-value="stbSATB Hn Flx2 Obax2 Str Bc" | stbSATB Hn 2Fl 2Oba Str Bc
| data-sort-value="000.23: 179" | 23: 179
| data-sort-value="I/18: 055" | I/18: 55
| after Z 5264b; text by Heermann
| 
|- style="background: #E3F6CE;"
| data-sort-value="0108.000" | 108
| data-sort-value="110.002" rowspan="3" | 1.
| rowspan="3" | 1725-04-29
| Cantata Es ist euch gut, daß ich hingehe (Cantate)
| A maj.
| data-sort-value="atbSATB Obax2 Str Bc" | atbSATB 2Oba Str Bc
| data-sort-value="000.23: 203" | 23: 203
| data-sort-value="I/12: 017" | I/12: 17
| after Z 2496 (/6); text by Ziegler, C. M., Gerhardt (/6), after Jh 16:7 (/1), 13 (/4)
| 
|- style="background: #E3F6CE;"
| data-sort-value="0108.006" rowspan="2" | 108/6
| chorale setting "Gott Vater, sende deinen Geist" (s. 10)
| rowspan="2" | B min.
| rowspan="2" | SATB
| data-sort-value="000.23: 230" rowspan="2" | 23: 230
| rowspan="2" data-sort-value="III/02 1: 098" | III/2.1: 69III/2.2: 26
| after Z 2496; text by Gerhardt
| rowspan="2" | 
|- style="background: #E3F6CE;"
| chorale setting "Kommt her zu mir, spricht Gottes Sohn"
| after Z 2496; text by Grünwald
|- style="background: #E3F6CE;"
| data-sort-value="0109.000" | 109
| data-sort-value="111.002" | 1.
| 1723-10-17
| Cantata Ich glaube, lieber Herr, hilf meinem Unglauben (Trinity XXI; 2 versions)
| D min.
| data-sort-value="atSATB Hn Obx2 Str Bc" | atSATB (Hn) 2Ob Str Bc
| data-sort-value="000.23: 231" | 23: 231
| I/25: 157
| after Z 7549 (/6); text after Mk 9:24 (/1), by Spengler (/6)
| 
|- style="background: #E3F6CE;"
| data-sort-value="0110.000" | 110
| data-sort-value="112.002" rowspan="2" | 1.
| rowspan="2" | 1725-12-25
| Cantata Unser Mund sei voll Lachens (Christmas)
| D maj.
| data-sort-value="satbSATB Trx3 Tmp Flx2 Obx3 Oba Odc Bas Str Bc" | satbSATB 3Tr Tmp 2Fl 3Ob Oba Odc Bas Str Bc
| data-sort-value="000.23: 263" | 23: 263
| data-sort-value="I/02: 071" | I/2: 71
| after Z 2072 (/7); text by Lehms, Füger (/7), after Ps 126:2–3 (/1), Jer 10:6 (/3), Lk 2:14 (/5)
| 
|- style="background: #E3F6CE;"
| data-sort-value="0110.007" | 110/7
| chorale setting "Wir Christenleut" (s. 5)
| B min.
| SATB
| data-sort-value="000.23: 324" | 23: 324
| data-sort-value="III/02 2: 032" | III/2.2: 32
| after Z 2072; text by Füger
| 
|- style="background: #E3F6CE;"
| data-sort-value="0111.000" | 111
| data-sort-value="113.002" | 1.
| 1725-01-25
| Cantata Was mein Gott will, das g'scheh allzeit (Epiphany III)
| A min.
| data-sort-value="satbSATB Obx2 Str Bc" | satbSATB 2Ob Str Bc
| data-sort-value="000.24: 001" | 24: 1
| data-sort-value="I/06: 027" | I/6: 27
| after Z 7568; text after Albert of Prussia
| 
|- style="background: #E3F6CE;"
| data-sort-value="0112.000" | 112
| data-sort-value="114.002" rowspan="3" | 1.
| rowspan="3" | 1731-04-08
| Cantata Der Herr ist mein getreuer Hirt (Misericordias)
| rowspan="3" | G maj.
| data-sort-value="satbSATB Hnx2 Obax2 Str Bc" | satbSATB 2Hn 2Oba Str Bc
| data-sort-value="000.24: 029" | 24: 29
| data-sort-value="I/11 1: 179" | I/11.1: 179
| rowspan="2" | after Z 4457; text by Meuslin after Ps. 23
| 
|- style="background: #E3F6CE;"
| data-sort-value="0112.005" rowspan="2" | 112/5
| chorale setting "Der Herr ist mein getreuer Hirt" (s. 5)
| rowspan="2" | SATB
| data-sort-value="000.24: 048" rowspan="2" | 24: 48
| rowspan="2" data-sort-value="III/02 1: 101" | III/2.1: 71III/2.2: 183,202
| rowspan="2" | 
|- style="background: #E3F6CE;"
| chorale setting "Allein Gott in der Höh sei Ehr"
| after Z 4457; text by Decius
|- style="background: #E3F6CE;"
| data-sort-value="0113.000" | 113
| data-sort-value="115.002" rowspan="2" | 1.
| rowspan="2" | 1724-08-20
| Cantata Herr Jesu Christ, du höchstes Gut (Trinity XI)
| rowspan="2" | B min.
| data-sort-value="satbSATB Fl Obax2 Str Bc" | satbSATB Fl 2Oba Str Bc
| data-sort-value="000.24: 049" | 24: 49
| data-sort-value="I/20: 079" | I/20: 79
| after Z 4486; text after Ringwaldt
| 
|- style="background: #E3F6CE;"
| data-sort-value="0113.008" | 113/8
| chorale setting "Herr Jesu Christ, du höchstes Gut" (s. 8)
| SATB
| data-sort-value="000.24: 080" | 24: 80
| data-sort-value="III/02 1: 074" | III/2.1: 54III/2.2: 175
| after Z 4486; text by Ringwaldt
| 
|- style="background: #E3F6CE;"
| data-sort-value="0114.000" | 114
| data-sort-value="116.002" rowspan="2" | 1.
| rowspan="2" | 1724-10-01
| Cantata Ach, lieben Christen, seid getrost (Trinity XVII)
| rowspan="2" | G min.
| data-sort-value="satbSATB Hn Fl Obx2 Str Bc" | satbSATB Hn Fl 2Ob Str Bc
| data-sort-value="000.24: 081" | 24: 81
| I/23: 287
| after Z 4441a; text after Gigas
| 
|- style="background: #E3F6CE;"
| data-sort-value="0114.007" | 114/7
| chorale setting "Ach, lieben Christen, seid getrost" (s. 6)
| SATB
| data-sort-value="000.24: 108" | 24: 108
| data-sort-value="III/02 1: 091" | III/2.1: 65III/2.2: 179
| after Z 4441a; text by Gigas
| 
|- style="background: #E3F6CE;"
| data-sort-value="0115.000" | 115
| data-sort-value="117.002" rowspan="3" | 1.
| rowspan="3" | 1724-11-05
| Cantata Mache dich, mein Geist, bereit (Trinity XXII)
| rowspan="3" | G maj.
| satbSATB Hn Fl Oba Str Vc Bc
| data-sort-value="000.24: 109" | 24: 109
| data-sort-value="I/26: 021" | I/26: 21
| after Z 6274a; text after Freystein
| 
|- style="background: #E3F6CE;"
| data-sort-value="0115.006" rowspan="2" | 115/6
| chorale setting "Mache dich, mein Geist, bereit" (s. 10)
| rowspan="2" | SATB
| data-sort-value="000.24: 132" rowspan="2" | 24: 132
| data-sort-value="III/02 1: 027" rowspan="2" | III/2.1: 25III/2.2: 23
| after Z 6274a; text by Freystein
| rowspan="2" | 
|- style="background: #E3F6CE;"
| chorale setting "Straf mich nicht in deinem Zorn"
| after Z 6274a; text by Albinus
|- style="background: #E3F6CE;"
| data-sort-value="0116.000" | 116
| data-sort-value="118.002" | 1.
| 1724-11-26
| Cantata Du Friedefürst, Herr Jesu Christ (Trinity XXV)
| A maj.
| data-sort-value="satbSATB Hn Obax2 Str Bc" | satbSATB Hn 2Oba Str Bc
| data-sort-value="000.24: 133" | 24: 133
| data-sort-value="I/27: 079" | I/27: 79
| after Z 4373; text after Ebert
| 
|- style="background: #E3F6CE;"
| data-sort-value="0117.000" | 117
| data-sort-value="119.002" rowspan="3" | 1.
| data-sort-value="1729-12-31" rowspan="3" | 1728–1731
| Cantata Sei Lob und Ehr dem höchsten Gut
| rowspan="3" | G maj.
| data-sort-value="atbSATB Flx2 Obx2 Obax2 Str Bc" | atbSATB 2Fl 2Ob 2Oba Str Bc
| data-sort-value="000.24: 159" | 24: 159
| I/34: 151
| rowspan="3" | after Z 4430; text by Schütz, J. J.
| 
|- style="background: #E3F6CE;"
| data-sort-value="0117.004" rowspan="2" | 117/4117/9
| chorale setting "Sei Lob und Ehr dem höchsten Gut" (ss. 4, 9)
| rowspan="2" | SATB
| data-sort-value="000.24: 159" rowspan="2" | 24: 159
| data-sort-value="III/02 1: 100" | III/2.1: 71III/2.2: 203
| 
|- style="background: #E3F6CE;"
| chorale setting "Sei Lob und Ehr dem höchsten Gut"
| data-sort-value="III/02 1: 001" | III/2.1: 9III/2.2: 147
| 
|- style="background: #E3F6CE;"
| data-sort-value="0119.000" | 119
| data-sort-value="121.002" | 1.
| 1723-08-30
| Cantata Preise, Jerusalem, den Herrn (council election)
| C maj.
| data-sort-value="satbSATB Trx4 Tmp Flx2 Obx3 Odcx2 Str Bc" | satbSATB 4Tr Tmp 2Fl 3Ob 2Odc Str Bc
| data-sort-value="000.24: 193" | 24: 193
| data-sort-value="I/32 1: 129" | I/32.1: 129
| after Z 8652 (/9); text after Ps 147:12–14 (/1), by Luther (/9)
| 
|- style="background: #E3F6CE;"
| data-sort-value="0120.100" | 120.1
| data-sort-value="122.002" | 1.
| data-sort-value="1729-08-25" | 1729 or earlier
| Cantata Gott, man lobet dich in der Stille (council election)
| A maj.
| data-sort-value="satbSATB Trx3 Obx2 Obax2 Vl Str Bc" | satbSATB 3Tr 2Ob 2Oba Vl Str Bc
| data-sort-value="000.24: 247" | 24: 247
| data-sort-value="I/32 2: 053" | I/32.2: 53
| after Z 8652 (/6); text after Ps 65:2 (/1), by Luther (/6); ↔ BWV 120.2/6 (/1 → .3/1), /1 (/2 → .3/2), /3 (/4 ↔ 1019a/3 → .3/4)
| 
|- style="background: #E3F6CE;"
| data-sort-value="0120.200" | 120.2
| data-sort-value="123.002" | 1.
| data-sort-value="1729-07-01" | 1729?
| Cantata Herr Gott, Beherrscher aller Dinge (wedding; incomplete)
| D maj.
| data-sort-value="satbSATB Trx3 Tmp Obx2 Obax2 Str Org Bc" | satbSATB 3Tr Tmp 2Ob 2Oba Str Org Bc
| data-sort-value="000.41: 149" | 41: 149
| data-sort-value="I/33: 075" | I/33: 75
| after BWV 1006/1 (/4 → 29/1), 137/5 (/8); text after JS 50:24 (/2), by Luther (/5), Neander (/8); ↔ BWV 120.1/2 (/1 → .3/2), /4 (/3 ↔ 1019a/3 → .3/4), /1 (/6 → .3/1)
| 
|-
| data-sort-value="0120.300" | 120.3
| data-sort-value="124.002" | 1.
| 1730-06-26
| Cantata Gott, man lobet dich in der Stille (200th anniversary of the Augsb. Confess.; music lost, partially reconstructable)
| 
| data-sort-value="saSATB Trx3 Tmp Obax2 Vl Str Bc" | saSATB 3Tr Tmp 2Oba Vl Str Bc ?
| 
| I/34I/32.2
| after BWV 120.1/1 (=.2/6), /2 (=.2/1 → 232II/9), /4 (=.2/3 ↔ 1019a/3); text by Picander
| 
|- style="background: #E3F6CE;"
| data-sort-value="0121.000" | 121
| data-sort-value="125.001" rowspan="2" | 1.
| rowspan="2" | 1724-12-26
| Cantata Christum wir sollen loben schon (Christmas 2)
| rowspan="2" | E min.
| data-sort-value="satbSATB Cnt Tbnx3 Oba Str Bc" | satbSATB Cnt 3Tbn Oba Str Bc
| data-sort-value="000.26: 001" | 26: 1
| data-sort-value="I/03 1: 057" | I/3.1: 57
| data-sort-value="after Z 0297c, text after Luther" | after Z 297c, text after Luther
| 
|- style="background: #E3F6CE;"
| data-sort-value="0121.006" | 121/6
| chorale setting "Christum wir sollen loben schon" (s. 8)
| SATB
| data-sort-value="000.26: 020" | 26: 20
| data-sort-value="III/02 2: 031" | III/2.2: 31
| data-sort-value="after Z 0297c, text by Luther" | after Z 297c, text by Luther
| 
|- style="background: #E3F6CE;"
| data-sort-value="0122.000" | 122
| data-sort-value="126.001" rowspan="2" | 1.
| rowspan="2" | 1724-12-31
| Cantata Das neugeborne Kindelein (Christmas I)
| rowspan="2" | G min.
| data-sort-value="satbSATB Flx3 Obx2 Tai Str Bc" | satbSATB 3Fl 2Ob Tai Str Bc
| data-sort-value="000.26: 021" | 26: 21
| data-sort-value="I/03 2: 053" | I/3.2: 53
| data-sort-value="after Z 0491; text after Schneegaß" | after Z 491; text after Schneegaß
| 
|- style="background: #E3F6CE;"
| data-sort-value="0122.006" | 122/6
| chorale setting "Das neugeborne Kindelein" (s. 5)
| SATB
| data-sort-value="000.26: 040" | 26: 40
| data-sort-value="III/02 1: 055" | III/2.1: 43III/2.2: 30,101
| data-sort-value="after Z 0491; text by Schneegaß" | after Z 491; text by Schneegaß
| 
|- style="background: #E3F6CE;"
| data-sort-value="0123.000" | 123
| data-sort-value="127.001" rowspan="2" | 1.
| rowspan="2" | 1725-01-06
| Cantata Liebster Immanuel, Herzog der Frommen (Epiphany)
| rowspan="2" | B min.
| data-sort-value="atbSATB Flx2 Obax2 Str Bc" | atbSATB 2Fl 2Oba Str Bc
| data-sort-value="000.26: 041" | 26: 41
| data-sort-value="I/05: 047" | I/5: 47
| after Z 4932c; text after Fritsch
| 
|- style="background: #E3F6CE;"
| data-sort-value="0123.006" | 123/6
| chorale setting "Liebster Immanuel, Herzog der Frommen" (s. 6)
| SATB
| data-sort-value="000.26: 060" | 26: 60
| data-sort-value="III/02 2: 108" | III/2.2: 108
| after Z 4932c; text by Fritsch
| 
|- style="background: #E3F6CE;"
| data-sort-value="0124.000" | 124
| data-sort-value="128.001" | 1.
| 1725-01-07
| Cantata Meinen Jesum laß ich nicht (Epiphany I)
| E maj.
| satbSATB Hn Oba Str Bc
| data-sort-value="000.26: 061" | 26: 61
| data-sort-value="I/05: 115" | I/5: 115
| after Z 3449; text after Keymann
| 
|- style="background: #E3F6CE;"
| data-sort-value="0125.000" | 125
| data-sort-value="129.001" | 1.
| 1725-02-02
| Cantata Mit Fried und Freud ich fahr dahin (Purification)
| E min.
| atbSATB Hn Fl Ob Oba Str Bc
| data-sort-value="000.26: 083" | 26: 83
| data-sort-value="I/28 1: 031" | I/28.1: 31
| after Z 3986; text after Luther
| 
|- style="background: #E3F6CE;"
| data-sort-value="0126.000" | 126
| data-sort-value="130.001" rowspan="2" | 1.
| rowspan="2" | 1725-02-04
| Cantata Erhalt uns, Herr, bei deinem Wort (Sexagesimae)
| rowspan="2" | A min.
| data-sort-value="atbSATB Tr Obx2 Str Bc" | atbSATB Tr 2Ob Str Bc
| data-sort-value="000.26: 111" | 26: 111
| data-sort-value="I/07: 155" | I/7: 155
| data-sort-value="after Z 0350, 1945b; text by Luther" | after Z 350a, 1945b (/6); text after Luther, Jonas, Walter
| 
|- style="background: #E3F6CE;"
| data-sort-value="0126.006" | 126/6
| chorale setting "Verleih uns Frieden gnädiglich" (ss. 1–2)
| SATB
| data-sort-value="000.26: 131" | 26: 131
| data-sort-value="III/02 2: 126" | III/2.2: 126(in g)
| after Z 1945b; text by Luther, Walter
| 
|- style="background: #E3F6CE;"
| data-sort-value="0127.000" | 127
| data-sort-value="131.001" rowspan="2" | 1.
| rowspan="2" | 1725-02-11
| Cantata Herr Jesu Christ, wahr' Mensch und Gott (Estomihi)
| rowspan="2" | F maj.
| data-sort-value="stbSATB Tr Flx2 Obx2 Str Bc" | stbSATB Tr 2Fl 2Ob Str Bc
| data-sort-value="000.26: 133" | 26: 133
| data-sort-value="I/08: 107" | I/8: 107
| after Z 2570; text after Eber; /1 → BWV 127/1 (variant)
| 
|- style="background: #E3F6CE;"
| data-sort-value="0127.005" | 127/5
| chorale setting "Herr Jesu Christ, wahr' Mensch und Gott" (s. 8)
| SATB
| data-sort-value="000.26: 160" | 26: 160
| data-sort-value="III/02 1: 060" | III/2.1: 46III/2.2: 169
| after Z 2570; text by Eber
| 
|-
| data-sort-value="0127.V01" | 127/1 (var.)
| data-sort-value="131.002" | 1.
| data-sort-value="1750-01-01" | 1750
| Chorus "Herr Jesu Christ, wahr' Mensch und Gott" (Passion oratorio movement)
| E♭ maj.
| data-sort-value="SATB Flx2 Obx2 Str Bc" | SATB 2Fl 2Ob Str Bc
| 
| data-sort-value="I/41: 095" | I/41: 95
| data-sort-value="after BWV 0127/1" | after BWV 127/1; → BC D 10
| 
|- style="background: #E3F6CE;"
| data-sort-value="0128.000" | 128
| data-sort-value="132.001" | 1.
| 1725-05-10
| Cantata Auf Christi Himmelfahrt allein (Ascension)
| G maj.
| data-sort-value="atbSATB Tr Hnx2 Obx2 Obax2 Odc Str Bc" | atbSATB Tr 2Hn 2Ob 2Oba Odc Str Bc
| data-sort-value="000.26: 163" | 26: 163
| I/12: 101
| after Z 4457 (/1), 5206b (/5); text by Ziegler, C. M.,  (/1),  (/5)
| 
|- style="background: #E3F6CE;"
| data-sort-value="0129.000" | 129
| data-sort-value="133.001" rowspan="3" | 1.
| rowspan="3" | 1727-06-08
| Cantata Gelobet sei der Herr, mein Gott (Trinity)
| rowspan="3" | D maj.
| data-sort-value="sabSATB Trx3 Tmp Fl Obx2 Oba Str Bc" | sabSATB 3Tr Tmp Fl 2Ob Oba Str Bc
| data-sort-value="000.26: 185" | 26: 185
| data-sort-value="I/15: 037" | I/15: 37
| rowspan="2" | after Z 5206b; text by Olearius, J.
| 
|- style="background: #E3F6CE;"
| data-sort-value="0129.005" rowspan="2" | 129/5
| chorale setting "Gelobet sei der Herr, mein Gott" (s. 5)
| rowspan="2" | SATB
| data-sort-value="000.26: 224" rowspan="2" | 26: 224
| rowspan="2" data-sort-value="III/02 1: 114" | III/2.1: 80
| rowspan="2" | 
|- style="background: #E3F6CE;"
| chorale setting "O Gott, du frommer Gott"
| after Z 5206b; text by Heermann
|- style="background: #E3F6CE;"
| data-sort-value="0130.100" | 130.1
| data-sort-value="134.001" rowspan="2" | 1.
| rowspan="2" | 1724-09-29
| Cantata Herr Gott, dich loben alle wir (Michaelmas; 1st version)
| rowspan="2" | C maj.
| data-sort-value="satbSATB Trx3 Tmp Fl Obx3 Str Bc" | satbSATB 3Tr Tmp Fl 3Ob Str Bc
| data-sort-value="000.26: 231" | 26: 231
| data-sort-value="I/30: 001" | I/30: 1
| data-sort-value="after Z 0368; text after Eber" | after Z 368; text after Eber; → BWV 130.2
| 
|- style="background: #E3F6CE;"
| data-sort-value="0130.106" | 130/6
| chorale setting "Herr Gott, dich loben alle wir" (s. 11)
| SATB
| data-sort-value="000.26: 268" | 26: 268
| data-sort-value="III/02 1: 085" | III/2.1: 61III/2.2: 218
| data-sort-value="after Z 0368; text by Eber" | after Z 368; text by Eber
| 
|- style="background: #E3F6CE;"
| data-sort-value="0130.200" | 130.2
| data-sort-value="134.002" | 1.
| data-sort-value="1733-12-31" | 1732–1735
| Cantata Herr Gott, dich loben alle wir (Michaelmas; 2nd version)
| C maj.
| data-sort-value="satbSATB Trx3 Tmp Fl Obx3 Str Bc" | satbSATB 3Tr Tmp Fl 3Ob Str Bc
| 
| data-sort-value="I/30: 048" | I/30: 48
| data-sort-value="after BWV 0130.1 (same text)" | after BWV 130.1 (same text)
| 
|- style="background: #E3F6CE;"
| data-sort-value="0131.000" | 131
| data-sort-value="135.001" | 1.
| data-sort-value="1707-07-01" | 1707
| Cantata Aus der Tiefen rufe ich, Herr, zu dir
| G min.
| satbSATB Ob Bas Str Bc
| data-sort-value="000.28: 001" | 28: 1
| data-sort-value="I/34: 067" | I/34: 67
| after Z 4486 (/2, /4); text after Ps. 130, by Ringwaldt (/2, /4); → BWV 131a
| 
|- style="background: #E3F6CE;"
| data-sort-value="0132.000" | 132
| data-sort-value="136.002" | 1.
| 1715-12-22
| Cantata Bereitet die Wege, bereitet die Bahn (Advent IV)
| A maj.
| satbSATB Ob Bas Str Vc Bc
| data-sort-value="000.28: 033" | 28: 33
| data-sort-value="I/01: 099" | I/1: 99rev 2: 97
| text by Franck, S., Cruciger (/6)
| 
|- style="background: #E3F6CE;"
| data-sort-value="0133.000" | 133
| data-sort-value="137.001" rowspan="2" | 1.
| rowspan="2" | 1724-12-27
| Cantata Ich freue mich in dir (Christmas 3)
| A maj.
| data-sort-value="satbSATB Cnt Obax2 Str Bc" | satbSATB Cnt 2Oba Str Bc
| data-sort-value="000.28: 051" | 28: 51
| data-sort-value="I/03 1: 135" | I/3.1: 135
| ↔ Z 5187; text after Ziegler, C.
| 
|- style="background: #E3F6CE;"
| data-sort-value="0133.006" | 133/6
| chorale setting "Ich freue mich in dir" (s. 4)
| D maj.
| SATB
| data-sort-value="000.28: 080" | 28: 80
| data-sort-value="III/02 1: 056" | III/2.1: 44III/2.2: 34
| ↔ Z 5187; text by Ziegler, C.
| 
|- style="background: #E3F6CE;"
| data-sort-value="0134.300" | 134.3
| data-sort-value="138.001" | 1.
| data-sort-value="1731-03-27" | 1731-03-271735-04-12
| Cantata Ein Herz, das seinen Jesum lebend weiß (Easter 3; later version)
| B♭ maj.
| data-sort-value="atSATB Obx2 Str Bc" | atSATB 2Ob Str Bc
| data-sort-value="000.28: 081" | 28: 81
| data-sort-value="I/10: 069" | I/10: 69
| data-sort-value="after BWV 0134.2" | after BWV 134.2
| 
|- style="background: #E3F6CE;"
| data-sort-value="0134.200" | 134.2
| data-sort-value="138.002" | 1.
| 1724-04-11
| Cantata Ein Herz, das seinen Jesum lebend weiß (Easter 3; early version)
| B♭ maj.
| data-sort-value="atSATB Obx2 Str Bc" | atSATB 2Ob Str Bc
| data-sort-value="000.28: 081, 287" | 28: 81, 287
| data-sort-value="I/10: 106" | I/10: 106
| data-sort-value="after BWV 0134.1" | after BWV 134.1; → BWV 134.3
| 
|- style="background: #E3F6CE;"
| data-sort-value="0134.100" | 134.1
| data-sort-value="138.003" | 1.
| 1719-01-01
| Secular cantata Die Zeit, die Tag und Jahre macht (congratulation for New Year)
| B♭ maj.
| data-sort-value="atSATB Obx2 Str Bc" | atSATB 2Ob Str Bc    
| data-sort-value="000.29: 209" | 29: 209
| data-sort-value="I/35: 049" | I/35: 49
| text by Hunold; → BWV 134.2
| 
|- style="background: #E3F6CE;"
| data-sort-value="0135.000" | 135
| data-sort-value="139.002" | 1.
| 1724-06-25
| Cantata Ach Herr, mich armen Sünder (Trinity III)
| E min.
| data-sort-value="atbSATB Cnt Tbn Obx2 Str Bc" | atbSATB Cnt Tbn 2Ob Str Bc
| data-sort-value="000.28: 119" | 28: 119
| I/16: 197
| after Z 5385a; text after Schneegaß
| 
|- style="background: #E3F6CE;"
| data-sort-value="0136.000" | 136
| data-sort-value="140.002" rowspan="2" | 1.
| rowspan="2" | 1723-07-18
| Cantata Erforsche mich, Gott, und erfahre mein Herz (Trinity VIII)
| A min.
| data-sort-value="atbSATB Hn Obx2 Obax2 Str Bc" | atbSATB Hn 2Ob 2Oba Str Bc
| data-sort-value="000.28: 137" | 28: 137
| I/18: 129
| after Z 2164 (/6); text after Ps 139:23 (/1: → BWV 234/6), by Heermann (/6)
| 
|- style="background: #E3F6CE;"
| data-sort-value="0136.006" | 136/6
| chorale setting "Wo soll ich fliehen hin" (s. 9)
| B min.
| SATB
| data-sort-value="000.28: 164" | 28: 164
| data-sort-value="III/02 2: 191" | III/2.2: 191
| after Z 2164; text by Heermann
| 
|- style="background: #E3F6CE;"
| data-sort-value="0137.000" | 137
| data-sort-value="141.002" rowspan="3" | 1.
| rowspan="3" | 1725-08-19
| Cantata Lobe den Herren, den mächtigen König der Ehren (Trinity XII)
| rowspan="3" | C maj.
| data-sort-value="satbSATB Trx3 Tmp Obx2 Str Bc" | satbSATB 3Tr Tmp 2Ob Str Bc
| data-sort-value="000.28: 165" | 28: 165
| I/20: 171
| after Z 1912a–c; text by Neander; /2 → BWV 650; /5 → 120.2/8
| 
|- style="background: #E3F6CE;"
| data-sort-value="0137.005" rowspan="2" | 137/5
| chorale setting "Lobe den Herren, den mächtigen König der Ehren" (s. 5)
| rowspan="2" | SATB
| data-sort-value="000.28: 196" rowspan="2" | 28: 196
| rowspan="2" data-sort-value="III/02 1: 077" | III/2.1: 56
| after Z 1912a–c; text by Neander; → BWV 120.2/8
| rowspan="2" | 
|- style="background: #E3F6CE;"
| chorale setting "Hast du denn, Jesu, dein Angesicht gänzlich verborgen"
| after Z 1912a–c; text by Fritsch
|- style="background: #E3F6CE;"
| data-sort-value="0138.000" | 138
| data-sort-value="142.001" | 1.
| 1723-09-05
| Cantata Warum betrübst du dich, mein Herz (Trinity XV)
| B min.
| data-sort-value="satbSATB Obax2 Str Bc" | satbSATB 2Oba Str Bc
| data-sort-value="000.28: 197" | 28: 197
| data-sort-value="I/22: 019" | I/22: 19
| after Z 1689a; /4 → BWV 236/3
| 
|- style="background: #E3F6CE;"
| data-sort-value="0139.000" | 139
| data-sort-value="143.001" | 1.
| 1724-11-12
| Cantata Wohl dem, der sich auf seinen Gott (Trinity XXIII)
| E maj.
| data-sort-value="satbSATB Obax2 Str Bc" | satbSATB 2Oba Str Bc
| data-sort-value="000.28: 223" | 28: 223
| data-sort-value="I/26: 097" | I/26: 97
| after Z 2383; text after 
| 
|- style="background: #E3F6CE;"
| data-sort-value="0140.000" | 140
| data-sort-value="144.001" rowspan="2" | 1.
| rowspan="2" | 1731-11-25
| Cantata Wachet auf, ruft uns die Stimme (Trinity XXVII)
| rowspan="2" | E♭ maj.
| data-sort-value="stbSATB Hn Obx2 Tai Vl Str Bc" | stbSATB Hn 2Ob Tai Vl Str Bc
| data-sort-value="000.28: 249" | 28: 249
| I/27: 149
| after Z 8405a, text after Nicolai; /4 → BWV 645
| 
|- style="background: #E3F6CE;"
| data-sort-value="0140.007" | 140/7
| chorale setting "Wachet auf, ruft uns die Stimme" (s. 3)
| SATB
| data-sort-value="000.28: 284" | 28: 284
| data-sort-value="III/02 1: 017" | III/2.1: 19III/2.2: 101
| after Z 8405a, text by Nicolai
| 
|-
| data-sort-value="0143.000" rowspan="2" | 143
| data-sort-value="145.003" rowspan="2" | 1.
| data-sort-value="1710-01-01" rowspan="2" | ?
| rowspan="2" | Cantata Lobe den Herrn, meine Seele (New Year)
| B♭ maj.
| data-sort-value="stbSATB Hnx3 Tmp Bas Str Bc" | stbSATB 3Hn Tmp Bas Str Bc
| data-sort-value="000.30: 043" | 30: 43
| data-sort-value="I/04: 165" | I/4: 165rev 2: 3
| rowspan="2" | after Z 4373; text after Ps 146, by Ebert (/2, /7)
| rowspan="2" | 
|-
| C maj.
| data-sort-value="stbSATB Trx3 Tmp Bas Str Bc" | stbSATB 3Tr Tmp Bas Str Bc
| 
| data-sort-value="rev 02: 119" | rev 2: 119
|- style="background: #E3F6CE;"
| data-sort-value="0144.000" | 144
| data-sort-value="146.002" rowspan="3" | 1.
| rowspan="3" | 1724-02-06
| Cantata Nimm, was dein ist, und gehe hin (Septuagesima)
| B min.
| data-sort-value="satSATB Obx2 Oba Str Bc" | satSATB 2Ob Oba Str Bc
| data-sort-value="000.30: 075" | 30: 75
| data-sort-value="I/07: 001" | I/7: 1
| after Z 5629 (/3), 7568 (/6); text after Mt 20:14 (/1), by Rodigast (/3), Albert of Prussia (/6)
| 
|- style="background: #E3F6CE;"
| data-sort-value="0144.003" | 144/3
| chorale setting "Was Gott tut, das ist wohlgetan" (s. 1)
| G maj.
| rowspan="2" | SATB
| data-sort-value="000.30: 087" | 30: 87
| data-sort-value="III/02 1: 043" | III/2.1: 34III/2.2: 36
| after Z 5629; text by Rodigast
| 
|- style="background: #E3F6CE;"
| data-sort-value="0144.006" | 144/6
| chorale setting "Was mein Gott will, das g'scheh allzeit" (s. 1)
| B min.
| data-sort-value="000.30: 092" | 30: 92
| data-sort-value="III/02 1: 044" | III/2.1: 35III/2.2: 157
| after Z 7568; text by Albert of Prussia
| 
|- style="background: #F5F6CE;"
| data-sort-value="0145.000" | 145/1–5
| data-sort-value="147.002" rowspan="3" | 1.
| rowspan="3" | 1729-04-19
| Cantata Ich lebe, mein Herze, zu deinem Ergötzen (Easter 3)
| D maj.
| data-sort-value="stbSATB Tr Fl Obx2 Str Bc" | stbSATB Tr Fl 2Ob Str Bc
| data-sort-value="000.30: 104" | 30: 104
| I/10: 111
| by Bach, C. P. E.?; after Z 1743 (/5); text by Picander, Herman (/5)
| 
|- style="background: #F5F6CE;"
| data-sort-value="0145.005" rowspan="2" | 145/5
| chorale setting "Erschienen ist der herrlich Tag" (s. 14)
| F♯ min.
| rowspan="2" | SATB
| data-sort-value="000.30: 122" | 30: 122
| data-sort-value="III/02 2: 214" | III/2.2: 214
| rowspan="2" | by Bach, C. P. E.?; after Z 1743; text by Herman
| rowspan="2" | 
|- style="background: #F5F6CE;"
| chorale setting "Erschienen ist der herrlich Tag"
| E min.
| 
| data-sort-value="III/02 2: 012" | III/2.2: 12
|- style="background: #F5F6CE;"
| data-sort-value="0145.a00" rowspan="2" | 145/a
| data-sort-value="148.001" rowspan="2" | 1.
| rowspan="2" | 
| chorale setting "Auf, mein Herz, des Herren Tag" (s. 1)
| rowspan="2" | D maj.
| rowspan="2" | SATB (or) Org
| data-sort-value="000.30: 093" rowspan="2" | 30: 93
| data-sort-value="III/02 2: 195" rowspan="2" | III/2.2: 195
| by Bach, C. P. E.; after Z 3432b; text by Neumann
| 
|- style="background: #F5F6CE;"
| chorale setting "Jesus, meine Zuversicht"
| by Bach, C. P. E.; after Z 3432b; text by L. H. of Brandenb.
| 
|- style="background: #F6E3CE;"
| data-sort-value="0146.000" | 146
| data-sort-value="148.002" | 1.
| 1726-05-12
| Cantata Wir müssen durch viel Trübsal (Jubilate)
| D min.
| data-sort-value="satbSATB Fl Obx2 Obax2 Tai Str Org Bc" | satbSATB Fl 2Ob 2Oba Tai Str Org Bc
| data-sort-value="000.30: 123" | 30: 123
| data-sort-value="I/11 2: 065" | I/11.2: 65
| after Z 6551 (/8); text after Acts 14:22 (/2); /1 & /2 ↔ BWV 1052/1 & /2
| 
|- style="background: #E3F6CE;"
| data-sort-value="0147.200" | 147.2
| data-sort-value="149.002" | 1.
| 1723-07-02
| Cantata Herz und Mund und Tat und Leben (Visitation)
| D maj.
| data-sort-value="satbSATB Tr Obx2 Oba Odcx2 Str Bc" | satbSATB Tr 2Ob Oba 2Odc Str Bc
| data-sort-value="000.30: 191" | 30: 191
| data-sort-value="I/28: 063" | I/28: 63
| after BWV 147.1/1–5 (/1, /3, /7, /5, /9), Z 6551 (/6, /10); text by Franck, S. (/1, /3, /7, /5, /9), Janus (/6, /10)
| 
|- style="background: #E3F6CE;"
| data-sort-value="0147.100" | 147.1
| data-sort-value="150.002" | 1.
| 1716-12-20
| Cantata Herz und Mund und Tat und Leben (Advent IV)
| D maj.
| data-sort-value="satbSATB Tr Ob Str Bc" | satbSATB Tr Ob Str Bc
| 
| data-sort-value="I/01" | I/1
| text by Franck, S., Kolross (/6); /1–/5 → BWV 147.2/1, /3, /7, /5, /9
| 
|- style="background: #F5F6CE;"
| data-sort-value="0148.000" | 148
| data-sort-value="151.002" rowspan="2" | 1.
| rowspan="2" | 1723-09-19
| Cantata Bringet dem Herrn Ehre seines Namens (Trinity XVII)
| D maj.
| data-sort-value="atSATB Tr Obax2 Odc Str Bc" | atSATB Tr 2Oba Odc Str Bc
| data-sort-value="000.30: 235" | 30: 235
| I/23: 253
| after Z 2164 (/6); text after Picander
| 
|- style="background: #F5F6CE;"
| data-sort-value="0148.006" | 148/6
| chorale setting "Wo soll ich fliehen hin"
| F♯ min.F min.
| SATB
| data-sort-value="000.30: 260" | 30: 260
| data-sort-value="III/02 2: 016" | III/2.2: 16
| after Z 2164; text by Heermann
| 
|-
| data-sort-value="0149.000" | 149
| data-sort-value="152.002" | 1.
| 1729-09-29
| Cantata Man singet mit Freuden vom Sieg (Michaelmas)
| D maj.
| data-sort-value="satbSATB Trx3 Tmp Obx3 Bas Str Vne Bc" | satbSATB 3Tr Tmp 3Ob Bas Str Vne Bc
| data-sort-value="000.30: 261" | 30: 261
| data-sort-value="I/30: 097" | I/30: 97
| after BWV 208/15 (/1), Z 8326 (/7); text by Picander, Schalling (/7)
| 
|- id="BWV 149/1a" style="background: #E3F6CE;"
| data-sort-value="0149.A01" | 149/1a	
| data-sort-value="152.003" | 1.
| data-sort-value="1729-09-28" | Fall 1729
| Cantata opening: "Concerto" (incomplete; abandoned alternative start of BWV 149?)
| D maj.
| SATB 3Tr Tmp 2Ob Str Bc
| 
| I/40I/30
| data-sort-value="in SBB P 0175" | in SBB P 175; was BWV Anh. 198
| 
|-
| data-sort-value="0150.000" | 150
| data-sort-value="153.002" | 1.
| 1707-07-10
| Cantata Nach dir, Herr, verlanget mich (Trinity III)
| B min.
| data-sort-value="satbSATB Bas Vlx2 Bc" | satbSATB Bas 2Vl Bc
| data-sort-value="000.30: 301" | 30: 301
| data-sort-value="I/41: 003" | I/41: 3
| text after Ps 25 (/2, /4, /6)
| 
|- style="background: #E3F6CE;"
| data-sort-value="0151.000" | 151
| data-sort-value="154.002" rowspan="2" | 1.
| rowspan="2" | 1725-12-27
| Cantata Süßer Trost, mein Jesus kömmt (Christmas 3)
| rowspan="2" | G maj.
| satbSATB Fl Vl Oba Str Bc
| data-sort-value="000.32: 001" | 32: 1
| data-sort-value="I/03 1: 169" | I/3.1: 169
| after Z 198 (/5); text by Lehms, Herman (/5)
| 
|- style="background: #E3F6CE;"
| data-sort-value="0151.005" | 151/5
| chorale setting "Lobt Gott, ihr Christen allzugleich" (s. 8)
| SATB
| data-sort-value="000.32: 016" | 32: 16
| data-sort-value="III/02 2: 030" | III/2.2: 30
| after Z 198; text by Herman
| 
|- style="background: #E3F6CE;"
| data-sort-value="0152.000" | 152
| data-sort-value="155.002" | 1.
| 1714-12-30
| Cantata Tritt auf die Glaubensbahn (Christmas I)
| E min.
| sb Fl Ob Va Vdg Bc
| data-sort-value="000.32: 017" | 32: 17
| data-sort-value="I/03 2: 003" | I/3.2: 3
| text by Franck, S.; /1 ↔ BWV 536/2, → 536a/2
| 
|- style="background: #E3F6CE;"
| data-sort-value="0153.000" | 153
| data-sort-value="156.001" rowspan="6" | 1.
| rowspan="6" | 1724-01-02
| Cantata Schau, lieber Gott, wie meine Feind (Christmas II)
| A min.
| atbSATB Str Bc
| data-sort-value="000.32: 041" | 32: 41
| data-sort-value="I/04: 199" | I/4: 199
| after Z 4431 (/1), 5385a (/5), 533a (/9); text by Denicke (/1), Gerhardt (/5), Moller (/9), after Is 14:10 (/3)
| 
|- style="background: #E3F6CE;"
| data-sort-value="0153.001" rowspan="2" | 153/1
| chorale setting "Schau, lieber Gott, wie meine Feind" (s. 1)
| rowspan="2" | A min.
| rowspan="2" | SATB
| data-sort-value="000.32: 043" rowspan="2" | 32: 43
| rowspan="2" data-sort-value="III/02 2: 003" | III/2.2: 3
| after Z 4431; text by Denicke
| rowspan="2" | 
|- style="background: #E3F6CE;"
| chorale setting "Ach Gott, vom Himmel sieh darein"
| after Z 4431; text by Martin Luther
|- style="background: #E3F6CE;"
| data-sort-value="0153.005" rowspan="2" | 153/5
| chorale setting "Befiehl du deine Wege" (s. 5)
| rowspan="2" | A min.
| rowspan="2" | SATB
| data-sort-value="000.32: 046" rowspan="2" | 32: 46
| rowspan="2" data-sort-value="III/02 2: 014" | III/2.2: 14
| after Z 5385a; text by Gerhardt
| rowspan="2" | 
|- style="background: #E3F6CE;"
| chorale setting "Herzlich tut mich verlangen"
| after Z 5385a; text by Knoll
|- style="background: #E3F6CE;"
| data-sort-value="0153.009" | 153/9
| chorale setting "Ach Gott, wie manches Herzeleid" (ss. 16–18)
| C maj.
| SATB
| data-sort-value="000.32: 058" | 32: 58
| data-sort-value="III/02 2: 128" | III/2.2: 128
| data-sort-value="after Z 0533a; text by Moller" | after Z 533a; text by Moller
| 
|- style="background: #E3F6CE;"
| data-sort-value="0154.000" | 154
| data-sort-value="157.002" rowspan="4" | 1.
| rowspan="4" | 1724-01-09
| Cantata Mein liebster Jesus ist verloren (Epiphany I)
| B min.
| data-sort-value="atbSATB Obax2 Str Hc Bc" | atbSATB 2Oba Str Hc Bc
| data-sort-value="000.32: 059" | 32: 59
| data-sort-value="I/05: 089" | I/5: 89
| after Z 6551 (/3), 3449 (/8); text by Janus (/3), Keymann (/8), after Lk 2:49; /3 → BWV 359
| 
|- style="background: #E3F6CE;"
| data-sort-value="0154.003" rowspan="2" | 154/3
| chorale setting "Jesu, meiner Seelen Wonne" (s. 2)
| rowspan="2" | A maj.
| rowspan="2" | SATB
| data-sort-value="000.32: 065" rowspan="2" | 32: 65
| rowspan="2" data-sort-value="III/02 1: 127" | III/2.1: 87III/2.2: 137
| after Z 6551; text by Janus; → BWV 359
| rowspan="2" | 
|- style="background: #E3F6CE;"
| chorale setting "Werde munter, mein Gemüte"
| after Z 6551; text by Rist
|- style="background: #E3F6CE;"
| data-sort-value="0154.008" | 154/8
| chorale setting "Meinen Jesum lass ich nicht, weil" (s. 6)
| D maj.
| SATB
| data-sort-value="000.32: 082" | 32: 82
| data-sort-value="III/02 1: 129" | III/2.1: 88III/2.2: 88
| after Z 3449; text by Keymann
| 
|- style="background: #E3F6CE;"
| data-sort-value="0155.000" | 155
| data-sort-value="158.002" rowspan="2" | 1.
| data-sort-value="1716-01-19" rowspan="2" | 1716-01-191724-01-16
| Cantata Mein Gott, wie lang, ach lange? (Epiphany II)
| D min.
| satbSATB Bas Str Bc
| data-sort-value="000.32: 083" | 32: 83
| data-sort-value="I/05: 173" | I/5: 173
| after Z 4430 (/5); text by Franck, S., Speratus (/5)
| 
|- style="background: #E3F6CE;"
| data-sort-value="0155.005" | 155/5
| chorale setting "Es ist das Heil uns kommen her" (s. 12)
| F maj.
| SATB
| data-sort-value="000.32: 096" | 32: 96
| data-sort-value="III/02 2: 194" | III/2.2: 194
| after Z 4430; text by Speratus
| 
|- style="background: #F5F6CE;"
| data-sort-value="0156.000" | 156
| data-sort-value="159.001" rowspan="2" | 1.
| rowspan="2" | 1729-01-23
| Cantata Ich steh mit einem Fuß im Grabe (Epiphany III)
| F maj.
| satbSATB Ob Str Bc
| data-sort-value="000.32: 097" | 32: 97
| data-sort-value="I/06: 091" | I/6: 91
| after Z 2383 (/2), 4438 (/6); text by Picander, Schein (/2),  (/6); /1 ↔ BWV 1056/2
| 
|- style="background: #F5F6CE;"
| data-sort-value="0156.006" | 156/6
| chorale setting "Herr, wie du willt, so schicks mit mir" (s. 1)
| C maj.
| SATB
| data-sort-value="000.32: 114" | 32: 114
| data-sort-value="III/02 2: 185" | III/2.2: 185
| after Z 4438; text by 
| 
|- style="background: #F6E3CE;"
| data-sort-value="0157.200" | 157.2
| data-sort-value="160.001" | 1.
| data-sort-value="1741-02-06" | after 1727-02-06
| Cantata Ich lasse dich nicht, du segnest mich denn (funeral; later: Purification)
| B min.
| tbSATB Fl Ob Oba Va 2Vl Bc
| data-sort-value="000.32: 115" | 32: 115
| data-sort-value="I/34: 041" | I/34: 41
| after Z 3449 (/5), BWV 157.1 (same text)
| 
|-
| data-sort-value="0157.100" | 157.1
| data-sort-value="160.002" | 1.
| 1727-02-06
| Cantata Ich lasse dich nicht, du segnest mich denn (funeral)
| 
| tbSATB Fl Oba Va Bc
| 
| data-sort-value="I/34" | I/34
| text by Picander, Keymann (/5), after Gen 32:27 (/1); → BWV 157.2
| 
|- style="background: #F6E3CE;"
| data-sort-value="0158.000" | 158
| data-sort-value="161.001" rowspan="2" | 1.
| data-sort-value="1730-07-01" rowspan="2" | 
| Cantata Der Friede sei mit dir (Purification; later: Easter 3)
| D maj.
| sbSATB Ob Vl Bc
| data-sort-value="000.32: 141" | 32: 141
| I/10: 129
| after Z 6531 (/2), 7012a (/4); text by Albinus (/2), Luther (/4; ↔ BWV 279)
| 
|- style="background: #F6E3CE;"
| data-sort-value="0158.004" | 158/4
| chorale setting "Christ lag in Todes Banden" (s. 5)
| E min.
| SATB
| data-sort-value="000.32: 154" | 32: 154
| data-sort-value="III/02 1: 024" | III/2.1: 24III/2.2: 155
| after Z 7012a; text by Luther; ↔ BWV 279
| 
|- style="background: #F5F6CE;"
| data-sort-value="0159.000" | 159
| data-sort-value="161.002" rowspan="2" | 1.
| rowspan="2" | 1729-02-27
| Cantata Sehet, wir gehn hinauf gen Jerusalem (Estomihi)
| C min.
| satbSATB Ob Str Bc
| data-sort-value="000.32: 155" | 32: 155
| data-sort-value="I/08: 153" | I/8: 153
| after Z 5385a (/2), 6288a–b (/5); text by Picander, Gerhardt (/2), Stockmann (/5), after Lk 18:31 (/1), Jh 19:30 (/4)
| 
|- style="background: #F5F6CE;"
| data-sort-value="0159.005" | 159/5
| chorale setting "Jesu Leiden, Pein und Tod" (s. 33)
| E♭ maj.
| SATB
| data-sort-value="000.32: 168" | 32: 168
| data-sort-value="III/02 1: 052" | III/2.1: 41III/2.2: 33
| after 6288a–b; text by Stockmann
| 
|- style="background: #E3F6CE;"
| data-sort-value="0161.000" | 161
| data-sort-value="162.003" rowspan="3" | 1.
| rowspan="3" | 1716-09-27
| Cantata Komm, du süße Todesstunde (Trinity XVI; 1st version)
| C maj.
| data-sort-value="atSATB Flx2 Str Org Bc" | atSATB 2Fl Str Org Bc
| data-sort-value="000.33: 001" | 33: 1
| data-sort-value="I/23: 001" | I/23: 1, 33
| after Z 5385a; text by Franck, S., Knoll; → BWV 161, v2
| 
|- style="background: #E3F6CE;"
| data-sort-value="0161.006" rowspan="2" | 161/6
| chorale setting "Herzlich tut mich verlangen" (s. 4)
| rowspan="2" | A min.
| rowspan="2" | SATB
| data-sort-value="000.33: 027" rowspan="2" | 33: 27
| rowspan="2" data-sort-value="III/02 1: 034" | III/2.1: 29III/2.2: 160
| after Z 5385a; text by Knoll
| rowspan="2" | 
|- style="background: #E3F6CE;"
| chorale setting "Befiehl du deine Wege"
| after Z 5385a; text by Gerhardt
|- 
| data-sort-value="0161.B00" | 161, v2
| data-sort-value="163.002" | 1.
| data-sort-value="1736-12-31" | 1723–1750?
| Cantata Komm, du süße Todesstunde (Trinity XVI; 2nd version)
| C maj.
| data-sort-value="satSATB Flx2 Str Bc" | satSATB 2Fl Str Bc
| 
| data-sort-value="I/23: 033" | I/23: 33
| after BWV 161; text by Franck, S., Knoll
| 
|- style="background: #E3F6CE;"
| data-sort-value="0162.100" | 162.1
| data-sort-value="163.003" | 1.
| 1716-10-25
| Cantata Ach! ich sehe, itzt, da ich zur Hochzeit gehe (Trinity XX)
| A min.
| satbSATB Str Bc
| 
| data-sort-value="I/25: 001" | I/25: 1
| after Z 6783 (/6); text by Franck, S.,  Rosenmüller (/6); → BWV 162.2
| 
|- style="background: #E3F6CE;"
| data-sort-value="0162.200" | 162.2
| data-sort-value="163.004" | 1.
| 1723-10-10
| Cantata Ach! ich sehe, itzt, da ich zur Hochzeit gehe (Trinity XX)
| B min.
| satbSATB Hn Str Bc
| data-sort-value="000.33: 029" | 33: 29(in a)
| data-sort-value="I/25: 023" | I/25: 23
| after BWV 162.1 (same text)
| 
|- style="background: #E3F6CE;"
| data-sort-value="0163.000" | 163
| data-sort-value="164.002" | 1.
| 1715-11-24
| Cantata Nur jedem das Seine (Trinity XXIII)
| B min.
| data-sort-value="satbSATB Str Vcx2 Bc" | satbSATB Str 2Vc Bc
| data-sort-value="000.33: 047" | 33: 47
| data-sort-value="I/26: 077" | I/26: 77
| after Z 3449 (/5), 2177 (/6); text by Franck, S., Heermann (/6)
| 
|- style="background: #E3F6CE;"
| data-sort-value="0164.000" | 164
| data-sort-value="165.002" rowspan="2" | 1.
| rowspan="2" | 1725-08-26
| Cantata Ihr, die ihr euch von Christo nennet (Trinity XIII)
| G min.
| data-sort-value="satbSATB Flx2 Obx2 Str Bc" | satbSATB 2Fl 2Ob Str Bc
| data-sort-value="000.33: 065" | 33: 65
| data-sort-value="I/21: 057" | I/21: 57
| after Z 4297a (/6); text by Franck, S., Cruciger (/6)
| 
|- style="background: #E3F6CE;"
| data-sort-value="0164.006" | 164/6
| chorale setting "Herr Christ, der einge Gottes Sohn" (s. 5)
| B♭ maj.
| SATB
| data-sort-value="000.33: 088" | 33: 88
| data-sort-value="III/02 1: 082" | III/2.1: 59III/2.2: 57
| after Z 4297a; text by Cruciger
| 
|- style="background: #F6E3CE;"
| data-sort-value="0165.000" | 165
| data-sort-value="166.001" | 1.
| data-sort-value="1715-06-16" | 1715-06-161724-06-04
| Cantata O heilges Geist- und Wasserbad (Trinity)
| G maj.
| satbSATB Fag Str Bc
| data-sort-value="000.33: 089" | 33: 89
| data-sort-value="I/15: 001" | I/15: 1
| data-sort-value="after Z 0159 (/6)" | after Z 159 (/6); text by Franck, S., Helmbold (/6)
| 
|- style="background: #E3F6CE;"
| data-sort-value="0166.000" | 166
| data-sort-value="167.001" rowspan="2" | 1.
| rowspan="2" | 1724-05-07
| Cantata Wo gehest du hin? (Cantate)
| B♭ maj.
| satbSATB Ob Str Bc
| data-sort-value="000.33: 105" | 33: 105
| data-sort-value="I/12: 001" | I/12: 1
| after Z 4486 (/3), 2778 (/6); text by Franck, S., Ringwaldt (/3), E. J. of Schwarzburg-Rudolstadt (/6), after Jh 16:5 (/1); /2 → BWV 584
| 
|- style="background: #E3F6CE;"
| data-sort-value="0166.006" | 166/6
| chorale setting "Wer weiß, wie nahe mir mein Ende" (s. 1)
| G min.
| SATB
| data-sort-value="000.33: 122" | 33: 122
| data-sort-value="III/02 2: 116" | III/2.2: 116
| after 2778; text by E. J. of Schwarzburg-Rudolstadt
| 
|- style="background: #E3F6CE;"
| data-sort-value="0167.000" | 167
| data-sort-value="168.001" | 1.
| 1723-06-24
| Cantata Ihr Menschen, rühmet Gottes Liebe (24 June: feast of John the Baptist)
| G maj.
| satbSATB Tr Ob Odc Str Bc
| data-sort-value="000.33: 123" | 33: 123
| data-sort-value="I/29: 001" | I/29: 1
| after Z 8244 (/5); text by Gramann (/5)
| 
|- style="background: #E3F6CE;"
| data-sort-value="0168.000" | 168
| data-sort-value="168.002" rowspan="2" | 1.
| rowspan="2" | 1725-07-29
| Cantata Tue Rechnung! Donnerwort (Trinity IX)
| rowspan="2" | B min.
| data-sort-value="satbSATB Obax2 Str Bc" | satbSATB 2Oba Str Bc
| data-sort-value="000.33: 147" | 33: 147
| data-sort-value="I/19: 087" | I/19: 87
| after Z 4486 (/6); text by Franck, S., Ringwaldt (/6)
| 
|- style="background: #E3F6CE;"
| data-sort-value="0168.006" | 168/6
| chorale setting "Herr Jesu Christ, du höchstes Gut" (s. 8)
| SATB
| data-sort-value="000.33: 166" | 33: 166
| data-sort-value="III/02 2: 052" | III/2.2: 52
| after Z 4486; text by Ringwaldt
| 
|- style="background: #E3F6CE;"
| data-sort-value="0169.000" | 169
| data-sort-value="169.002" rowspan="2" | 1.
| rowspan="2" | 1726-10-20
| Cantata Gott soll allein mein Herze haben (Trinity XVIII)
| D maj.
| data-sort-value="aSATB Obax2 Tai Str Org Bc" | aSATB 2Oba Tai Str Org Bc
| data-sort-value="000.33: 167" | 33: 167
| data-sort-value="I/24: 059" | I/24: 59
| after Z 2029a (/7); text by Birkmann, Luther (/7); /1 & /5 ↔ BWV 1053/1 & /2
| 
|- style="background: #E3F6CE;"
| data-sort-value="0169.007" | 169/7
| chorale setting "Nun bitten wir den Heiligen Geist" (s. 3)
| A maj.
| SATB
| data-sort-value="000.33: 192" | 33: 192
| data-sort-value="III/02 1: 036" | III/2.1: 30III/2.2: 54
| after Z 2029a; text by Luther
| 
|- style="background: #E3F6CE;"
| data-sort-value="0170.000" | 170
| data-sort-value="170.002" | 1.
| 1726-07-28
| Cantata Vergnügte Ruh, beliebte Seelenlust (Trinity VI)
| D maj.
| a Oba Fl Str Org Bc
| data-sort-value="000.33: 193" | 33: 193
| data-sort-value="I/17 2: 061" | I/17.2: 61
| text by Lehms
| 
|- style="background: #E3F6CE;"
| data-sort-value="0171.000" | 171
| data-sort-value="171.002" rowspan="2" | 1.
| rowspan="2" | 1729-01-01
| Cantata Gott, wie dein Name, so ist auch dein Ruhm (New Year)
| rowspan="2" | D maj.
| data-sort-value="satbSATB Trx3 Tmp Obx2 Str Bc" | satbSATB 3Tr Tmp 2Ob Str Bc
| data-sort-value="000.35: 001" | 35: 1
| data-sort-value="I/04: 131" rowspan="2" | I/4: 131
| data-sort-value="after BWV 0205 (/4), 0041/6 (/6)" | after BWV 205 (/4), 41/6 (/6); text by Picander, Hermann (/6)
| 
|- style="background: #E3F6CE;"
| data-sort-value="0171.006" | 171/6
| chorale setting "Jesu, nun sei gepreiset" (s. 2)
| SATB
| data-sort-value="000.35: 032" | 35: 32
| data-sort-value="after BWV 0041/6" | after BWV 41/6; text by Hermann
| 
|- style="background: #E3F6CE;"
| data-sort-value="0172.100" | 172.1
| data-sort-value="172.002" rowspan="2" | 1.
| rowspan="2" | 1714-05-20
| Cantata Erschallet, ihr Lieder, erklinget, ihr Saiten! (Pentecost; 1st version = Weimar version; incomplete)
| C maj.
| data-sort-value="SATB Trx3 Tmp Fl Ob Vlx2 Vax2 Vc Bas Bc" | (SATB) 3Tr Tmp (Fl? Ob 2)Vl 2Va Vc Bas (Bc)
| 
| I/13
| after Z 8359 (/6); text by Franck, S.?, Nicolai (/6), after Jh 14:23 (/2); → BWV 172.2
| 
|- style="background: #E3F6CE;"
| data-sort-value="0172.106" | 172/6
| chorale setting "Wie schön leuchtet der Morgenstern" (s. 4)
| F maj.
| SATB
| data-sort-value="000.35: 069" | 35: 69
| data-sort-value="III/02 2: 187" | III/2.2: 187
| after Z 8359; text by Nicolai
| 
|- style="background: #E3F6CE;"
| data-sort-value="0172.200" | 172.2
| data-sort-value="172.003" | 1.
| 1724-05-28
| Cantata Erschallet, ihr Lieder, erklinget, ihr Saiten! (Pentecost; 2nd version = 1st Leipzig version)
| D maj.
| data-sort-value="satbSATB Trx3 Tmp Fl Ob Oba Bas Vlx2 Vax2 Vc Bc" | satbSATB 3Tr Tmp Fl Ob Oba Bas 2Vl 2Va Vc Bc
| 
| data-sort-value="I/13: 001" | I/13: 1
| after BWV 172.1 (same text); → BWV 172.3
| 
|- style="background: #E3F6CE;"
| data-sort-value="0172.300" | 172.3
| data-sort-value="173.002" | 1.
| 1731-05-13
| Cantata Erschallet, ihr Lieder, erklinget, ihr Saiten! (Pentecost; 3rd version = 2nd Leipzig version)
| C maj.
| data-sort-value="satbSATB Trx3 Tmp Ob Bas Vlx2 Vax2 Vc Org Bc" | satbSATB 3Tr Tmp Ob Bas 2Vl 2Va Vc Org Bc
| data-sort-value="000.35: 035" | 35: 35
| data-sort-value="I/13: 033" | I/13: 33
| after BWV 172.2 (same text)
| 
|- style="background: #E3F6CE;"
| data-sort-value="0173.200" | 173.2
| data-sort-value="173.003" | 1.
| data-sort-value="1727-06-02" | 1727-06-021731-05-14
| Cantata Erhöhtes Fleisch und Blut (Pentecost 2)
| D maj.
| data-sort-value="satbSATB Flx2 Str Bc" | satbSATB 2Fl Str Bc
| data-sort-value="000.35: 071" | 35: 71
| data-sort-value="I/14: 001" | I/14: 1
| data-sort-value="after BWV 0173.1" | after BWV 173.1
| 
|- style="background: #E3F6CE;"
| data-sort-value="0173.100" | 173.1
| data-sort-value="174.002" | 1.
| 1722-12-10
| Secular cantata Durchlauchtster Leopold (birthday of Leopold of Anhalt-Köthen)
| D maj.
| data-sort-value="satbSATB Flx2 Str Bc" | satbSATB 2Fl Str Bc
| data-sort-value="000.34: 001" | 34: 1
| data-sort-value="I/35: 095" | I/35: 95
| data-sort-value="→ BWV 0173.2" | → BWV 173.2 (/1–/5, /8), 175/4 (/7)
| 
|- style="background: #E3F6CE;"
| data-sort-value="0174.000" | 174
| data-sort-value="175.002" rowspan="2" | 1.
| rowspan="2" | 1729-06-06
| Cantata Ich liebe den Höchsten von ganzem Gemüte (Pentecost 2)
| G maj.
| data-sort-value="atbSATB Cdcx2 Obx2 Tai Vlx3 Vax3 Vcx3 Str Bc" | atbSATB 2Cdc 2Ob Tai 3Vl 3Va 3Vc Str Bc
| data-sort-value="000.35: 103" | 35: 103
| data-sort-value="I/14: 063" | I/14: 63
| after BWV 1048/1 (/1), Z 8326 (/5); text by Picander, Schalling (/5)
| 
|- style="background: #E3F6CE;"
| data-sort-value="0174.005" | 174/5
| chorale setting "Herzlich lieb hab ich dich, o Herr" (s. 1)
| D maj.
| SATB
| data-sort-value="000.35: 157" | 35: 157
| data-sort-value="III/02 1: 111" | III/2.1: 78III/2.2: 32
| after Z 8326; text by Schalling
| 
|- style="background: #E3F6CE;"
| data-sort-value="0175.000" | 175
| data-sort-value="176.001" rowspan="3" | 1.
| rowspan="3" | 1725-05-22
| Cantata Er rufet seinen Schafen mit Namen (Pentecost 3)
| rowspan="3" | G maj.
| data-sort-value="atbSATB Trx2 Flx3 Str Vc Bc" | atbSATB 2Tr 3Fl Str Vc Bc
| data-sort-value="000.35: 159" | 35: 159
| I/14: 147 
| data-sort-value="after BWV 0173.1/7 (/4)" | after BWV 173.1/7 (/4), BWV 59/3 (/7); text by Ziegler, C. M., Rist (/7), after Jh 10:3 & 6 (/1 & /5)
| 
|- style="background: #E3F6CE;"
| data-sort-value="0175.007" rowspan="2" | 175/7
| chorale setting "O Gottes Geist, mein Trost und Rat" (s. 9)
| rowspan="2" | SATB
| data-sort-value="000.35: 177" rowspan="2" | 35: 177
| rowspan="2" data-sort-value="III/02 1: 110" | III/2.1: 76
| after Z 7445a; text by Rist
| rowspan="2" | 
|- style="background: #E3F6CE;"
| chorale setting "Komm, Heiliger Geist, Herre Gott"
| after Z 7445a; text by Luther
|- style="background: #E3F6CE;"
| data-sort-value="0176.000" | 176
| data-sort-value="177.001" rowspan="3" | 1.
| rowspan="3" | 1725-05-27
| Cantata Es ist ein trotzig und verzagt Ding (Trinity)
| rowspan="3" | C min.
| data-sort-value="sabSATB Obx2 Odc Str Bc" | sabSATB 2Ob Odc Str Bc
| data-sort-value="000.35: 179" | 35: 179
| data-sort-value="I/15: 017" | I/15: 17 
| after Z 7246 (/6); text by Ziegler, C. M., Gerhardt (/6), after Jer 17:9 (/1)
| 
|- style="background: #E3F6CE;"
| data-sort-value="0176.006" rowspan="2" | 176/6
| chorale setting "Was alle Weisheit in der Welt" (s. 8)
| rowspan="2" | SATB
| data-sort-value="000.35: 198" rowspan="2" | 35: 198
| rowspan="2" data-sort-value="III/02 2: 067" | III/2.2: 67
| after Z 7246; text by Gerhardt
| rowspan="2" | 
|- style="background: #E3F6CE;"
| chorale setting "Christ unser Herr zum Jordan kam"
| after Z 7246; text by Luther
|- style="background: #E3F6CE;"
| data-sort-value="0177.000" | 177
| data-sort-value="178.001" rowspan="2" | 1.
| rowspan="2" | 1732-07-06
| Cantata Ich ruf zu dir, Herr Jesu Christ (Trinity IV)
| G min.
| data-sort-value="satSATB Obx2 Odc Bas Vl Str Bc" | satSATB 2Ob Odc Bas Vl Str Bc
| data-sort-value="000.35: 199" | 35: 199
| data-sort-value="I/17 1: 077" | I/17.1: 77 
| rowspan="2" | after Z 7400; text by Agricola, J.
| 
|- style="background: #E3F6CE;"
| data-sort-value="0177.005" | 177/5
| chorale setting "Ich ruf zu dir, Herr Jesu Christ" (s. 5)
| G min.E min
| SATB
| data-sort-value="000.35: 234" | 35: 234
| data-sort-value="III/02 1: 067" | III/2.1: 50III/2.2: 40
| 
|- style="background: #E3F6CE;"
| data-sort-value="0178.000" | 178
| data-sort-value="178.002" | 1.
| 1724-07-30
| Cantata Wo Gott der Herr nicht bei uns hält (Trinity VIII)
| A min.
| data-sort-value="atbSATB Hn Obx2 Obax2 Str Bc" | atbSATB Hn 2Ob 2Oba Str Bc
| data-sort-value="000.35: 235" | 35: 235
| I/18: 159 
| after Z 4441a; text after Jonas
| 
|- style="background: #E3F6CE;"
| data-sort-value="0179.000" | 179
| data-sort-value="180.001" rowspan="3" | 1.
| rowspan="3" | 1723-08-08
| Cantata Siehe zu, daß deine Gottesfurcht nicht Heuchelei sei (Trinity XI)
| G min.
| data-sort-value="stbSATB Obx2 Odcx2 Str Bc" | stbSATB 2Ob 2Odc Str Bc
| data-sort-value="000.35: 273" | 35: 273
| data-sort-value="I/20: 055" | I/20: 55 
| 
|- style="background: #E3F6CE;"
| data-sort-value="0179.006" rowspan="2" | 179/6
| chorale setting "Ich armer Mensch, ich armer Sünder" (s. 1)
| rowspan="2" | A min.
| rowspan="2" | SATB
| data-sort-value="000.35: 292" rowspan="2" | 35: 292
| rowspan="2" data-sort-value="III/02 1: 075" | III/2.1: 55III/2.2: 196
| after Z 2778; text by 
| rowspan="2" | 
|- style="background: #E3F6CE;"
| chorale setting "Wer nur den lieben Gott lässt walten
| after Z 2778; text by Neumark
|- style="background: #E3F6CE;"
| data-sort-value="0180.000" | 180
| data-sort-value="180.002" rowspan="2" | 1.
| rowspan="2" | 1724-10-22
| Cantata Schmücke dich, o liebe Seele (Trinity XX)
| F maj.
| data-sort-value="satbSATB Flx2 Fl Ob Odc Str Vc Bc" | satbSATB 2Fl Fl Ob Odc Str Vc Bc
| data-sort-value="000.35: 293" | 35: 293
| data-sort-value="I/25: 041" | I/25: 41 
| after Z 6923; text after Franck, J.
| 
|- style="background: #E3F6CE;"
| data-sort-value="0180.007" | 180/7
| chorale setting "Schmücke dich, o liebe Seele" (s. 9)
| F maj.E♭ maj.
| SATB
| data-sort-value="000.35: 322" | 35: 322
| data-sort-value="III/02 1: 025" | III/2.1: 24III/2.2: 15
| after Z 6923; text by Franck, J.
| 
|- style="background: #E3F6CE;"
| data-sort-value="0181.000" | 181
| data-sort-value="181.002" | 1.
| 1724-02-13
| Cantata Leichtgesinnte Flattergeister (Sexagesima)
| E min.
| satbSATB Tr Fl Ob Str Bc
| data-sort-value="000.37: 001" | 37: 1
| data-sort-value="I/07: 133" | I/7: 133 
| 
| 
|- style="background: #E3F6CE;"
| data-sort-value="0182.000" rowspan="2" | 182
| data-sort-value="182.002" rowspan="2" | 1.
| 1714-03-25
| rowspan="2" | Cantata Himmelskönig, sei willkommen (Palm Sunday)
| B♭ maj.
| data-sort-value="atbSATB Fl Ob Vlx2 Vax2 Bc" rowspan="2" | atbSATB Fl (Ob 2)Vl 2Va Bc
| 
| data-sort-value="I/08 2: 001" | I/8.2: 1 
| rowspan="2" | after 6288a–b (/7); text by Franck, S.?, Stockmann (/7), after Ps 40:8-9 (/3)
| rowspan="2" | 
|- style="background: #E3F6CE;"
| data-sort-value="1724-03-25" | 1724-03-251728-03-21
| G maj.
| data-sort-value="000.37: 021" | 37: 21
| data-sort-value="I/08 2: 043" | I/8.2: 43
|- style="background: #E3F6CE;"
| data-sort-value="0183.000" | 183
| data-sort-value="183.002" rowspan="3" | 1.
| rowspan="3" | 1725-05-13
| Cantata Sie werden euch in den Bann tun (Exaudi)
| rowspan="3" | A min.
| data-sort-value="satbSATB Obax2 Odcx2 Str Vc Bc" | satbSATB 2Oba 2Odc Str Vc Bc
| data-sort-value="000.37: 059" | 37: 59
| I/12: 187 
| after Z 5267 (/5); text by Ziegler, C. M., Gerhardt (/5), after Jh 16:2 (/1)
| 
|- style="background: #E3F6CE;"
| data-sort-value="0183.005" rowspan="2" | 183/5
| chorale setting "Zeuch ein zu deinen Toren" (s. 5)
| rowspan="2" | SATB
| data-sort-value="000.37: 074" rowspan="2" | 37: 74
| rowspan="2" data-sort-value="III/02 2: 070" | III/2.2: 70
| after Z 5267; text by Gerhardt
| rowspan="2" | 
|- style="background: #E3F6CE;"
| chorale setting "Helft mir Gotts Güte preisen"
| after Z 5267; text by Eber
|- style="background: #E3F6CE;"
| data-sort-value="0184.200" | 184.2
| data-sort-value="184.001" rowspan="2" | 1.
| data-sort-value="1724-05-30" rowspan="2" | 1724-05-301727-06-031731-05-15
| Cantata Erwünschtes Freudenlicht (Pentecost 3)
| G maj.
| data-sort-value="satSATB Flx2 Str Bc" | satSATB 2Fl Str Bc
| data-sort-value="000.37: 075" | 37: 75
| I/14: 119 
| data-sort-value="after BWV 0184.1/1–/4" | after BWV 184.1/1–/4 & /6, Z 5690 (/5); text by Wildenfels (/5)
| 
|- style="background: #E3F6CE;"
| data-sort-value="0184.205" | 184.2/5
| chorale setting "O Herre Gott, dein göttlich Wort" (s. 8)
| D maj.G maj.
| SATB
| data-sort-value="000.37: 095" | 37: 95
| data-sort-value="III/02 1: 015" | III/2.1: 17III/2.2: 10
| after Z 5690; text by Wildenfels
| 
|- id="BWV 184a" style="background: #E3F6CE;"
| data-sort-value="0184.100" | 184.1
| data-sort-value="185.001" | 1.
| 1721-01-01
| Secular cantata (incomplete)
| G maj.
| data-sort-value="sb Flx2 Vl Str Bc" | sb 2Fl Vl Str Bc (?)
| 
| I/35 
| data-sort-value="→ BWV 0184/1–/4" | → BWV 184.2/1–/4, /6
| 
|- style="background: #E3F6CE;"
| data-sort-value="0185.100" | 185.1
| data-sort-value="185.002" rowspan="2" | 1.
| rowspan="2" | 1715-07-14
| Cantata Barmherziges Herze der ewigen Liebe (Trinity IV)
| rowspan="2" | F♯ min.
| satbSATB Ob Str Bc
| data-sort-value="000.37: 101" | 37: 101
| data-sort-value="I/17 1: 001" | I/17.1: 1
| after Z 7400 (/6); text by Franck, S., Agricola, J. (/6); → BWV 185.2
| 
|- style="background: #E3F6CE;"
| data-sort-value="0185.106" | 185/6
| chorale setting "Ich ruf zu dir, Herr Jesu Christ" (s. 1)
| SATB
| data-sort-value="000.37: 118" | 37: 118
| data-sort-value="III/02 1: 068" | III/2.1: 50
| after Z 7400; text by Agricola, J.
| 
|- style="background: #E3F6CE;"
| data-sort-value="0185.200" | 185.2
| data-sort-value="185.003" | 1.
| 1723-06-20
| Cantata Barmherziges Herze der ewigen Liebe (Trinity IV)
| G min.
| satbSATB Tr Ob Str Bc
| data-sort-value="000.37: 101" | 37: 101
| data-sort-value="I/17 1: 001" | I/17.1: 1
| after BWV 185.1 (same text)
| 
|- style="background: #E3F6CE;"
| data-sort-value="0186.200" | 186.2
| data-sort-value="186.002" | 1.
| 1723-07-11
| Cantata Ärgre dich, o Seele, nicht (Trinity VII)
| G min.
| data-sort-value="satbSATB Obx2 Tai Bas Str Bc" | satbSATB 2Ob Tai Bas Str Bc
| data-sort-value="000.37: 119" | 37: 119
| data-sort-value="I/18: 015" | I/18: 15
| after BWV 186.1/1–/5 (/1, /3, /5, /8, /10), Z 4430 (/6, /11); text by Franck, S. (/1, /3, /5, /8, /10), Speratus (/6, /11)
| 
|-
| data-sort-value="0186.100" | 186.1
| data-sort-value="187.002" | 1.
| 1716-12-13
| Cantata Ärgre dich, o Seele, nicht (Advent III; incomplete)
| 
| data-sort-value="stbSATB Obx2 Odc Tai Bas Str Bc" | stbSATB 2Ob Odc Tai Bas Str Bc
| 
| data-sort-value="I/01" | I/1
| text by Franck, S., Helmbold (/6); → BWV 186.2/1, /3, /5, /8, /10
| 
|- style="background: #E3F6CE;"
| data-sort-value="0187.000" | 187
| data-sort-value="188.001" rowspan="2" | 1.
| rowspan="2" | 1726-08-04
| Cantata Es wartet alles auf dich (Trinity VII)
| rowspan="2" | G min.
| data-sort-value="sabSATB Obx2 Str Bc" | sabSATB 2Ob Str Bc
| data-sort-value="000.37: 155" | 37: 155
| data-sort-value="I/18: 091" | I/18: 91
| 
|- style="background: #E3F6CE;"
| data-sort-value="0187.007" | 187/7
| chorale setting "Singen wir aus Herzensgrund" (ss. 4, 6)
| SATB
| data-sort-value="000.37: 191" | 37: 191
| data-sort-value="III/02 2: 061" | III/2.2: 61
| after Z 4816e; text by 
| 
|- style="background: #E3F6CE;"
| data-sort-value="0188.000" | 188
| data-sort-value="188.002" | 1.
| 1728-10-17
| Cantata Ich habe meine Zuversicht (Trinity XXI)
| D min.
| data-sort-value="satbSATB Obx2 Tai Str Org Bc" | satbSATB 2Ob Tai Str Org Bc
| data-sort-value="000.37: 193" | 37: 193
| I/25: 265
| after Z 2164 (/6); text by Picander; /1 ↔ BWV 1052/3
| 
|- style="background: #E3F6CE;"
| data-sort-value="0190.100" | 190.1
| data-sort-value="189.003" rowspan="2" | 1.
| rowspan="2" | 1724-01-01
| Cantata Singet dem Herrn ein neues Lied (New Year; incomplete)
| rowspan="2" | D maj.
| data-sort-value="atbSATB Trx3 Tmp Obx3 Oba Bas Str Bc" | atbSATB 3Tr Tmp 3Ob Oba Bas Str Bc
| data-sort-value="000.37: 227" | 37: 227
| data-sort-value="I/04: 001" | I/4: 1
| after Z 8652 (/1–/2), 8477a (/7); text by Luther (/1–/2), Hermann (/7); → BWV 190.2/1, /2, /3, /5
| 
|- style="background: #E3F6CE;"
| data-sort-value="0190.107" | 190/7
| chorale setting "Jesu, nun sei gepreiset" (s. 2)
| SATB
| data-sort-value="000.37: 257" | 37: 257
| data-sort-value="III/02 2: 189" | III/2.2: 189
| after 8477a; text by Hermann (/7)
| 
|-
| data-sort-value="0190.200" | 190.2
| data-sort-value="190.002" | 1.
| 1730-06-25
| Cantata Singet dem Herrn ein neues Lied (200th anniversary of the Augsb. Confess.; incomplete)
| 
| data-sort-value="atbSATB Trx3 Tmp Obx3 Str Bc" | atbSATB 3Tr Tmp 3Ob Str Bc (?)
| 
| I/34
| after BWV 190/1, /2, /3, /5; text by Picander, Luther (/1–/2, /7)
| 
|- style="background: #E3F6CE;"
| data-sort-value="0191.000" | 191
| data-sort-value="191.002" | 1.
| data-sort-value="1744-12-25" | 1743–1746
| Cantata Gloria in excelsis Deo (Christmas)
| D maj.
| data-sort-value="stSSATB Trx3 Tmp Flx2 Obx2 Str Bc" | stSSATB 3Tr Tmp 2Fl 2Ob Str Bc
| data-sort-value="000.41: 001" | 41: 1
| data-sort-value="I/02: 171" | I/2: 171
| data-sort-value="after BWV 0232/4" | after BWV 232/4, /5, /8, /12; text: Lk 2:14, doxology
| 
|- style="background: #E3F6CE;"
| data-sort-value="0192.000" | 192
| data-sort-value="191.003" | 1.
| data-sort-value="1730-10-31" | autumn 1730?
| Cantata Nun danket alle Gott (incomplete)
| G maj.
| data-sort-value="sbSATB Flx2 Obx2 Str Bc" | sbSATB 2Fl 2Ob Str Bc
| data-sort-value="000.41: 065" | 41: 65
| I/34: 107
| after Z 5142; text by Rinkart
| 
|- style="background: #E3F6CE;"
| data-sort-value="0193.200" | 193.2
| data-sort-value="192.002" | 1.
| 1727-08-25
| Cantata Ihr Tore zu Zion (council election; incomplete)
| D maj.
| data-sort-value="saSATB Obx2 Str Bc" | saSA(TB) 2Ob Str (Bc)
| data-sort-value="000.41: 091" | 41: 91
| data-sort-value="I/32 1: 201" | I/32.1: 201
| data-sort-value="after BWV 0193.1/1" | after BWV 193.1/1, /7, /9
| 
|-
| data-sort-value="0193.100" | 193.1
| data-sort-value="193.002" | 1.
| 1727-08-03
| Secular cantata Ihr Häuser des Himmels, ihr scheinenden Lichter (name day of Friedrich August II; incomplete)
| 
| data-sort-value="saSATB Obx2 Str Bc" | saSA(TB) 2Ob Str (Bc)
| 
| I/36
| text by Picander; → BWV 193.2/1, /3, /5
| 
|- style="background: #E3F6CE;"
| data-sort-value="0194.300" | 194.3
| data-sort-value="193.003" | 1.
| data-sort-value="1724-06-04" | 1724-06-041731-05-20
| Cantata Höchsterwünschtes Freudenfest (Trinity; 1st Leipzig version)
| B♭ maj.
| data-sort-value="stbSATB Obx3 Bas Str Bc" | stbSATB 3Ob Bas Str Bc
| data-sort-value="000.29: 099" | 29: 99
| I/31: 145
| data-sort-value="after BWV 0194.2" | after BWV 194.2 (same text); → BWV 194.4 
| 
|-
| data-sort-value="0194.400" | 194.4
| data-sort-value="193.004" | 1.
| 1726-06-16
| Cantata Nun lasst uns Gott, dem Herren? (Trinity; 2nd Leipzig version)
| B♭ maj.
| data-sort-value="stbSATB Obx3 Bas Str Bc" | stbSATB 3Ob Bas Str Bc
| data-sort-value="000.29: 099" | 29: 99
| I/31: 145, 235
| data-sort-value="after BWV 0194.3" | after BWV 194.3/12, /2, /3, /4, /5, /7, /10
| 
|- style="background: #E3F6CE;"
| data-sort-value="0194.200" | 194.2
| data-sort-value="193.005" rowspan="6" | 1.
| rowspan="6" | 1723-11-02
| Cantata Höchsterwünschtes Freudenfest (Störmthal version: consecration of church and organ)
| B♭ maj.
| data-sort-value="sabSATB Obx3 Bas Str Bc" | sabSATB 3Ob Bas Str Bc
| data-sort-value="000.29: 099" | 29: 99
| I/31: 123
| data-sort-value="after BWV 0194.1/1" | after BWV 194.1/1, /3, /5, /7, /9, Z 6543 (/6), 159 (/12); text by Heermann (/6), Gerhardt (/12); → BWV 194.3 
| 
|- style="background: #E3F6CE;"
| data-sort-value="0194.206" rowspan="3" | 194.2/6
| chorale setting "Treuer Gott, ich muß dir klagen" (ss. 6–7)
| rowspan="3" | B♭ maj.G maj.
| rowspan="3" | SATB
| data-sort-value="000.29: 124" rowspan="3" | 29: 124
| rowspan="3" data-sort-value="III/02 1: 018" | III/2.1: 20III/2.2: 35, 152
| after Z 6543; text by Heermann
| rowspan="3" | 
|- style="background: #E3F6CE;"
| chorale setting "Jesu, deine tiefen Wunden"
| after Z 6543; text by Heermann
|- style="background: #E3F6CE;"
| chorale setting "Freu dich sehr, o meine Seele"
| after Z 6543
|- style="background: #E3F6CE;"
| data-sort-value="0194.212" rowspan="2" | 194.2/12
| chorale setting "Wach auf, mein Herz, und singe" (ss. 9–10)
| rowspan="2" | B♭ maj.
| rowspan="2" | SATB
| data-sort-value="000.29: 138" rowspan="2" | 29: 138
| rowspan="2" data-sort-value="III/02 1: 019" | III/2.1: 20III/2.2: 52, 152
| data-sort-value="after Z 0159; text by Gerhardt" | after Z 159; text by Gerhardt
| rowspan="2" | 
|- style="background: #E3F6CE;"
| chorale setting "Nun lasst uns Gott dem Herren"
| data-sort-value="after Z 0159; text by Helmbold" | after Z 159; text by Helmbold
|-
| data-sort-value="0194.100" | 194.1
| data-sort-value="195.001" | 1.
| data-sort-value="1720-07-01" | 1717–1723?
| Secular cantata model for church cantata versions of BWV 194 (incomplete)
| B♭ maj.
| data-sort-value="Obx3 Str" | 3Ob Str &?
| 
| I/35
| data-sort-value="→ BWV 0194.2/1" | → BWV 194.2/1, /3, /5, /8, /10
| 
|- style="background: #E3F6CE;"
| data-sort-value="0195.300" | 195.3
| data-sort-value="195.002" | 1.
| data-sort-value="1748-12-31" | 1748–1749
| Cantata Dem Gerechten muß das Licht (wedding; last version)
| D maj.
| data-sort-value="satbSATB Trx3 Tmp Hnx2 Flx2 Obx2 Obax2 Str Bc" | satbSATB 3Tr Tmp 2Hn 2Fl 2Ob 2Oba Str Bc
| data-sort-value="000.13 1: 001" | 131: 1
| I/33: 171
| data-sort-value="after BWV 0195.2, Z 0198" | after BWV 195.2, Z 198 (/6); text after Ps 97:11–12 (/1), by Gerhardt (/6)
| 
|- style="background: #E3F6CE;"
| data-sort-value="0195.100" | 195.1
| data-sort-value="195.003" | 1.
| data-sort-value="1729-07-01" | 1727–1731
| Cantata Dem Gerechten muß das Licht (wedding; 1st version, lost)
| 
| data-sort-value="SATB Trx3 Tmp Flx2 Obx2 Str Bc" | SATB 3Tr Tmp 2Fl 2Ob Str Bc
| 
| I/33
| data-sort-value="→ BWV 0195.2" | → BWV 195.2 
| 
|- style="background: #E3F6CE;"
| data-sort-value="0195.200" | 195.2
| data-sort-value="196.002" | 1.
| data-sort-value="1742-07-01" | 
| Cantata Dem Gerechten muß das Licht (wedding; 2nd version, incomplete)
| 
| data-sort-value="SATB" | SATB &?
| 
| I/33
| data-sort-value="after BWV 0195.1" | after BWV 195.1, 30.1/5, /1 (/6, /8); text after Ps 97:11–12 (/1); → BWV 195.3
| 
|-
| data-sort-value="0196.000" | 196
| data-sort-value="197.001" | 1.
| data-sort-value="1708-06-05" | 1708-06-05?
| Cantata Der Herr denket an uns (wedding)
| C maj.
| stbSATB Str Bc
| data-sort-value="000.13 1: 071" | 131: 71
| data-sort-value="I/33: 001" | I/33: 1
| text after Ps. 115: 12–15
| 
|- style="background: #E3F6CE;"
| data-sort-value="0197.200" | 197.2
| data-sort-value="197.002" rowspan="3" | 1.
| data-sort-value="1736-12-31" rowspan="3" | 1736–1737
| Cantata Gott ist unsre Zuversicht (wedding)
| D maj.
| data-sort-value="sabSATB Trx3 Tmp Obx2 Obax2 Bas Str Bc" | sabSATB 3Tr Tmp 2Ob 2Oba Bas Str Bc
| data-sort-value="000.13 1: 095" | 131: 95
| I/33: 117
| after Z 2029a (/5), 2778 (/10), BWV 197.1/4, /6 (/6, /8); text by Luther (/5)
| 
|- style="background: #E3F6CE;"
| data-sort-value="0197.205" | 197.2/5
| chorale setting "Nun bitten wir den Heiligen Geist" (s. 3)
| A maj.
| SATB
| data-sort-value="000.13 1: 128" | 131: 128
| data-sort-value="III/02 2: 046" | III/2.2: 46
| after Z 2029a; text by Luther
| 
|- style="background: #E3F6CE;"
| data-sort-value="0197.210" | 197.2/10
| chorale setting "Wer nur den lieben Gott lässt walten"
| B min.
| SATB
| data-sort-value="000.13 1: 144" | 131: 144
| data-sort-value="III/02 2: 037" | III/2.2: 37
| after Z 2778; text by Neumark
| 
|- style="background: #E3F6CE;"
| data-sort-value="0197.100" | 197.1
| data-sort-value="199.001" rowspan="3" | 1.
| rowspan="3" | 1728-12-25
| Cantata Ehre sei Gott in der Höhe (Christmas; incomplete)
| rowspan="3" | D maj.
| data-sort-value="abSATB Flx2 Oba Bas Str Vc Bc" | abSATB 2Fl Oba Bas Str Vc Bc
| data-sort-value="000.41: 109" | 41: 109
| data-sort-value="I/02: 063" | I/2: 63
| after Z 5206b–c (/7); text by Picander,  Ziegler, C. (/7; ↔ BWV 398), after Lk 2:14 (/1); /4 & /6 → BWV 197.2/6, /8
| 
|- style="background: #E3F6CE;"
| data-sort-value="0197.107" rowspan="2" | 197.1/7
| chorale setting "Ich freue mich in dir" (s. 4)
| rowspan="2" | SATB
| data-sort-value="000.41: 114" rowspan="2" | 41: 114
| rowspan="2" data-sort-value="III/02 2: 182" | III/2.2: 182
| after Z 5206b–c; text by Ziegler, C.; ↔ BWV 398
| rowspan="2" | 
|- style="background: #E3F6CE;"
| chorale setting "O Gott, du frommer Gott"
| after Z 5206b–c; text by Heermann; ↔ BWV 398
|- style="background: #E3F6CE;"
| data-sort-value="0198.000" | 198
| data-sort-value="199.002" | 1.
| 1727-10-17
| Secular cantata Laß, Fürstin, laß noch einen Strahl a.k.a. Trauer-Ode (funeral ceremony for Christiane Eberhardine)
| B min.
| data-sort-value="satbSATB Flx2 Obx2 Obax2 Str Vdgx2 Lux2 Bc" | satbSATB 2Fl 2Ob 2Oba Str 2Vdg 2Lu Bc
| data-sort-value="000.13 3: 001" | 133: 144: 54
| I/38: 179
| text by Gottsched, J. C.; ↔ BWV 244a, 247
| 
|- style="background: #E3F6CE;"
| data-sort-value="0199.200" | 199.2
| data-sort-value="201.001" | 1.
| data-sort-value="1720-12-31" | 1720–1721
| Cantata Mein Herze schwimmt im Blut (Trinity XI; Köthen version; incomplete)
| D min.
| s Ob Str Vdg Bc
| data-sort-value="000.41: 202" | 41: 202
| data-sort-value="I/20: 048" | I/20: 48
| data-sort-value="after BWV 0199.1" | after BWV 199.1 (same text); → 199.3
| 
|-
| data-sort-value="0199.300" | 199.3
| data-sort-value="201.002" | 1.
| 1723-08-08
| Cantata Mein Herze schwimmt im Blut (Trinity XI; Leipzig version)
| D min.
| s Ob Str Vc Bc
| 
| data-sort-value="I/20: 023" | I/20: 23
| data-sort-value="after BWV 0199.2" | after BWV 199.2 (same text) 
| 
|- style="background: #E3F6CE;"
| data-sort-value="0199.100" | 199.1
| data-sort-value="201.003" | 1.
| 1714-08-12
| Cantata Mein Herze schwimmt im Blut (Trinity XI; Weimar version)
| C min.
| s Ob Str Bc
| data-sort-value="000.63 2: 000" | NBG 132
| data-sort-value="I/20: 001" | I/20: 1
| text by Lehms, Heermann (/6); → BWV 199.2
| 
|- style="background: #E3F6CE;"
| data-sort-value="0200.000" | 200
| data-sort-value="202.001" | 1.
| data-sort-value="1742-12-31" | 1742–1743 (JSB)
| Aria Bekennen will ich seinen Namen
| E maj.
| data-sort-value="a Vlx2 Bc" | a (2Vl) Bc
| 
| data-sort-value="I/28 1: 189" | I/28.1: 189
| after Stölzel; text after Lk 2:29–32
| 
|- style="background: #E3F6CE;"
| data-sort-value="0201.000" | 201
| data-sort-value="202.002" | 1.
| data-sort-value="1729-09-28" | autumn 1729
| Secular cantata Geschwinde, ihr wirbelnden Winde a.k.a. Der Streit zwischen Phoebus und Pan (dramma per musica)
| D maj.
| data-sort-value="sattbb Trx3 Tmp Flx2 Obx2 Oba Str Bc" | sattbb 3Tr Tmp 2Fl 2Ob Oba Str Bc
| data-sort-value="000.11 2: 001" | 112: 144: 85
| I/40: 117
| text by Picander; /7 → BWV 212/20
| 
|-
| data-sort-value="0202.000" | 202
| data-sort-value="204.001" | 1.
| data-sort-value="1718-07-01" | 1718?
| Secular cantata Weichet nur, betrübte Schatten (wedding)
| G maj.
| s Ob Str Bc
| data-sort-value="000.11 2: 073" | 112: 73
| data-sort-value="I/40: 001" | I/40: 1
| in D-LEb Peters Ms. R 8
| 
|-
| data-sort-value="0203.000" | 203
| data-sort-value="205.001" | 1.
| data-sort-value="1720-07-01" | 1720?
| Secular cantata Amore traditore
| A min.
| b Hc
| data-sort-value="000.11 2: 091" | 112: 91
| data-sort-value="I/41: 031" | I/41: 31
| 
| 
|- style="background: #E3F6CE;"
| data-sort-value="0204.000" | 204
| data-sort-value="205.002" | 1.
| data-sort-value="1726-12-31" | 1726–1727
| Secular cantata Ich bin in mir vergnügt a.k.a. Von der Vergnügsamkeit
| B♭ maj.
| data-sort-value="s Fl Obx2 Str Bc" | s Fl 2Ob Str Bc
| data-sort-value="000.11 2: 103" | 112: 103
| data-sort-value="I/40: 079" | I/40: 79
| text after Hunold
| 
|- style="background: #E3F6CE;"
| data-sort-value="0205.100" | 205.1
| data-sort-value="206.002" | 1.
| 1725-08-03
| Secular cantata Zerreißet, zersprenget, zertrümmert die Gruft a.k.a. Der zufriedengestellte Aeolus (dramma per musica for August Friedrich Müller)
| D maj.
| data-sort-value="satbSATB Trx3 Tmp Hnx2 Flx2 Obx2 Oba Str Va Vdg Bc" | satbSATB 3Tr Tmp 2Hn 2Fl 2Ob Oba Str Va Vdg Bc
| data-sort-value="000.11 2: 137" | 112: 13744: 39
| data-sort-value="I/38: 001" | I/38: 1
| text by Picander; → BWV 205.2/1–/7, /9–/11, /13, /15, 171/4, 216/7
| 
|- style="background: #E3F6CE;"
| data-sort-value="0205.200" | 205.2
| data-sort-value="208.002" | 1.
| 1734-02-19
| Secular cantata Blast Lärmen, ihr Feinde (dramma per musica; music lost but largely reconstructable; coronation of Augustus III)
| 
| data-sort-value="satbSATB Trx3 Tmp Hnx2 Flx2 Obx2 Oba Str Va Vdg Bc" | satbSATB 3Tr Tmp 2Hn 2Fl 2Ob Oba Str Va Vdg Bc
| 
| I/37
| data-sort-value="after BWV 0205.1/1" | after BWV 205.1/1–/7, /9–/11, /13, /15; text by Picander?
| 
|- style="background: #E3F6CE;"
| data-sort-value="0206.100" | 206.1
| data-sort-value="208.003" | 1.
| data-sort-value="1736-10-07" | 1736-10-07(1734?)
| Secular cantata Schleicht, spielende Wellen (dramma per musica; 1st version: birthday of Augustus III)
| D maj.
| data-sort-value="satbSATB Trx3 Tmp Flx3 Obax2 Str Bc" | satbSATB 3Tr Tmp 3Fl 2Oba Str Bc
| data-sort-value="000.20 2: 001" | 202: 1
| I/36: 157
| data-sort-value="→ BWV 0206.2" | → BWV 206.2
| 
|- style="background: #E3F6CE;"
| data-sort-value="0206.200" | 206.2
| data-sort-value="208.004" | 1.
| 1740-08-03
| Secular cantata Schleicht, spielende Wellen (dramma per musica; 2nd version: name day of Augustus III)
| D maj.
| data-sort-value="satbSATB Trx3 Tmp Flx3 Obx2 Obax2 Str Bc" | satbSATB 3Tr Tmp 3Fl 2Ob 2Oba Str Bc
| 
| I/36: 157
| data-sort-value="after BWV 0206.1" | after BWV 206.1
| 
|- style="background: #E3F6CE;"
| data-sort-value="0207.100" | 207.1
| data-sort-value="210.002" | 1.
| 1726-12-11
| Secular cantata Vereinigte Zwietracht der wechselnden Saiten (dramma per musica; appointment of professor Gottlieb Kortte)
| D maj.
| data-sort-value="satbSATB Trx3 Tmp Flx2 Obax2 Tai Str Bc" | satbSATB 3Tr Tmp 2Fl 2Oba Tai Str Bc
| data-sort-value="000.20 2: 071" | 202: 71
| data-sort-value="I/38: 097" | I/38: 97
| after BWV 1046/3 (/1); → BWV 207.2/1, /3, /5, /7–/9
| 
|- style="background: #E3F6CE;"
| data-sort-value="0207.200" | 207.2
| data-sort-value="211.002" | 1.
| 1735-08-03
| Secular cantata Auf, schmetternde Töne der muntern Trompeten (dramma per musica; name day of Augustus III)
| D maj.
| data-sort-value="satbSATB Trx3 Tmp Flx2 Obax2 Tai Str Bc" | satbSATB 3Tr Tmp 2Fl 2Oba Tai Str Bc
| data-sort-value="000.20 2: 139" | 202: 13934: 345
| data-sort-value="I/37: 001" | I/37: 1
| data-sort-value="after BWV 0207" | after BWV 207.1/1, /3, /5, /7–/9
| 
|- style="background: #E3F6CE;"
| data-sort-value="0208.100" | 208.1
| data-sort-value="212.001" | 1.
| 1713-02-23
| Secular cantata Was mir behagt, ist nur die muntre Jagd a.k.a. Hunting Cantata (1st version: birthday of Christian of Saxe-Weissenfels)
| F maj.
| data-sort-value="sstb Hnx2 Flx2 Obx2 Tai Bas Str Vc Bc Vne" | sstb 2Hn 2Fl 2Ob Tai Bas Str Vc Bc (Vne)
| data-sort-value="000.29: 001" | 29: 1
| data-sort-value="I/35: 001" | I/35: 1
| text by Franck, S.; → BWV 208.2, 1040, 68/4, /2, 149/1
| 
|-  style="background: #E3F6CE;"
| data-sort-value="1040.000" | 1040
| data-sort-value="212.002" | 1.
| 1713-02-23
| Trio (a.k.a. (Canonic) Trio Sonata; postlude to the Hunting Cantata?)
| F maj.
| Vl Ob Bc
| data-sort-value="000.29: 230" | 29: 230
| data-sort-value="I/35: 002" | I/35: 1
| data-sort-value="after BWV 0208/13" | after BWV 208.1/13; =BWV 208.1/13a
| 
|- style="background: #E3F6CE;"
| data-sort-value="0208.200" | 208.2
| data-sort-value="212.003" | 1.
| data-sort-value="1715-07-01" | 1715
| Secular cantata Was mir behagt, ist nur die muntre Jagd a.k.a. Hunting Cantata (2nd version: for Ernst August I of Saxe-Weimar)
| F maj.
| data-sort-value="sstb Hnx2 Flx2 Obx2 Tai Bas Str Vc Bc Vne" | sstb 2Hn 2Fl 2Ob Tai Bas Str Vc Bc (Vne)
| data-sort-value="000.29: 001" | 29: 1
| data-sort-value="I/35: 001" | I/35: 1
| after BWV 208.1 (near-identical text); → BWV 208.3
| 
|- style="background: #E3F6CE;"
| data-sort-value="0208.300" | 208.3
| data-sort-value="214.002" | 1.
| 1742-08-03
| Secular cantata Was mir behagt, ist nur die muntre Jagd (3rd version: name day of Augustus III)
| F maj.
| data-sort-value="sstb Hnx2 Flx2 Obx2 Tai Bas Str Vc Bc Vne" | sstb 2Hn 2Fl 2Ob Tai Bas Str Vc Bc (Vne)?
| 
| I/37
| after BWV 208.2; text after Franck, S.
| 
|-
| data-sort-value="0209.000" | 209
| data-sort-value="214.003" | 1.
| data-sort-value="1747-07-01" | 1747?
| Secular cantata Non sa che sia dolore (farewell of Lorenz Albrecht Beck?)
| B min.
| s Fl Str Bc
| data-sort-value="000.29: 043" | 29: 43
| data-sort-value="I/41: 043" | I/41: 43
| text after Metastasio
| 
|- style="background: #E3F6CE;"
| data-sort-value="0210.200" | 210.2
| data-sort-value="215.002" | 1.
| 1741-09-19
| Secular cantata O holder Tag, erwünschte Zeit (wedding)
| A maj.
| s Fl Oba Str Hc Vne
| data-sort-value="000.29: 067" | 29: 67
| data-sort-value="I/40: 035" | I/40: 35
| data-sort-value="after BWV 0210.1" | after BWV 210.1/1–/2, /4, /8, /10
| 
|- style="background: #E3F6CE;"
| data-sort-value="0210.100" | 210.1
| data-sort-value="216.002" | 1.
| 1729-01-12
| Secular cantata O angenehme Melodei (incomplete; homage to Christian of Saxe-Weissenfels)
| A maj.
| data-sort-value="s Fl Oba Str Bc" | s (Fl Oba Str Bc)?
| data-sort-value="000.29: 245" | 29: 245
|  I/39: 141
| data-sort-value="→ BWV 0210.2/1" | → BWV 210.2/1–/2, /4, /8, /10
| 
|- style="background: #E3F6CE;"
| data-sort-value="0211.000" | 211
| data-sort-value="217.001" | 1.
| data-sort-value="1734-07-01" | 1734
| Secular cantata Schweigt stille, plaudert nicht a.k.a. Coffee Cantata
| G maj.
| stb Fl Str Hc Bc
| data-sort-value="000.29: 139" | 29: 13944: 86
| I/40: 193
| text by Picander
| 
|- style="background: #E3F6CE;"
| data-sort-value="0212.000" | 212
| data-sort-value="218.001" | 1.
| 1742-08-30
| Secular cantata Mer hahn en neue Oberkeet a.k.a. Peasant Cantata (Cantate burlesque; homage to Carl Heinrich von Dieskau)
| G maj.
| sb Hn Fl Str Bc
| data-sort-value="000.29: 173" | 29: 17344: 132
| I/39: 151
| after BWV 1157/9 (/14), 201/7 (/20); text by Picander
| 
|- style="background: #E3F6CE;"
| data-sort-value="0213.000" | 213
| data-sort-value="219.002" | 1.
| 1733-09-05
| Secular cantata Laßt uns sorgen, laßt uns wachen a.k.a. Hercules auf dem Scheidewege (dramma per musica; birthday of Frederick Christian of Saxony)
| F maj.
| data-sort-value="satbSATB Hnx2 Obx2 Oba Vlx2 Vax2 Bc" | satbSATB 2Hn 2Ob Oba 2Vl 2Va Bc
| data-sort-value="000.34: 119" | 34: 119
| data-sort-value="I/36: 001" | I/36: 1
| text by Picander; /1, /3, /5, /7, /9, /11 → BWV 248/36, /19, /39, /41, /4, /29
| 
|- style="background: #E3F6CE;"
| data-sort-value="0214.000" | 214
| data-sort-value="221.002" | 1.
| 1733-12-08
| Secular cantata Tönet, ihr Pauken! Erschallet, Trompeten! (birthday of queen Maria Josepha)
| D maj.
| data-sort-value="satbSATB Trx3 Tmp Flx2 Obx2 Oba Str Vne Bc" | satbSATB 3Tr Tmp 2Fl 2Ob Oba Str Vne Bc
| data-sort-value="000.34: 175" | 34: 175
| data-sort-value="I/36: 089" | I/36: 89
| text by Picander; /1, /5, /7, /9 → BWV 248/1, /15, /8, /24
| 
|- style="background: #E3F6CE;"
| data-sort-value="0215.000" | 215
| data-sort-value="222.002" | 1.
| 1734-10-05
| Secular cantata Preise dein Glücke, gesegnetes Sachsen (anniversary of the election of Augustus III as king of Poland)
| D maj.
| data-sort-value="stbSATBx2 Trx3 Tmp Flx2 Obx2 Oba Str Va Bc" | stb2SATB 3Tr Tmp 2Fl 2Ob Oba Str Va Bc
| data-sort-value="000.34: 243" | 34: 243
| data-sort-value="I/37: 085" | I/37: 85
| 
|-
| data-sort-value="0216.100" | 216.1
| data-sort-value="223.002" | 1.
| 1728-02-05
| Secular cantata Vergnügte Pleißenstadt (wedding; incomplete)
| C maj.
| sa &?
| 
| data-sort-value="I/40: 021" | I/40: 21
| data-sort-value="after BWV 0204/8 (/3), 0205.1/13 (/7)" | after BWV 204/8 (/3), 205.1/13 (/7); text by Picander; → BWV 216.2/1, /3, /5, /7
| 
|-
| data-sort-value="0216.200" | 216.2
| data-sort-value="224.002" | 1.
| data-sort-value="1729-12-31" | 1728–1731
| Secular cantata Erwählte Pleißenstadt a.k.a. Apollo et Mercurius (incomplete)
| 
| at &?
| 
| I/39
| data-sort-value="after BWV 0216.1" | after BWV 216.1/1, /3, /5, /7; text by  after Picander
| 
|}

References

Further reading 

 NBA Neue Bach-Ausgabe, Bärenreiter, 1954 to 2007
 BWV Bach-Werke-Verzeichnis, Breitkopf & Härtel, 1998
 
 Alfred Dürr: The Cantatas of J.S. Bach, Oxford University Press, 2006. 
 Christoph Wolff/Ton Koopman: Die Welt der Bach-Kantaten Verlag J.B. Metzler, Stuttgart, Weimar 2006  (in German)
 Werner Neumann: Handbuch der Kantaten J.S.Bachs, 1947, 5th ed. 1984, 
 Hans-Joachim Schulze: Die Bach-Kantaten: Einführungen zu sämtlichen Kantaten Johann Sebastian Bachs Leipzig: Evangelische Verlags-Anstalt; Stuttgart: Carus-Verlag 2006 (Edition Bach-Archiv Leipzig)  (EVA),  (in German)
 Luigi Ferdinando Tagliavini. Studi sui testi delle Cantate sacre di J. S. Bach. Università di Padova, pubblicazioni della Facoltà di Lettere e Filosofia, vol. XXXI, Padova & Kassel, 1956, xv-291
 Geoffrey Turner. "Singing The Word: The Cantatas of J S Bach". New Blackfriars, volume 87, issue 1008, pp. 144–154
 J. C. J. Day. "The texts of Bach's Church cantatas: some observations". German Life and Letters, volume 13 (1960), num. 2, pp. 137–144
 Harald Streck. Die Verskunst in den poetischen Texten zu den Kantaten J. S. Bachs. Dissertation: Universität Hamburg 1971, 214 pages
 Walter F. Bischof. The Bach Cantatas University of Alberta 2003–2010
 Z. Philip Ambrose Texts of the Complete Vocal Works with English Translation and Commentary University of Vermont 2005–2011
 Robin Boyle. The Listener's Guide to the Bach Church Cantatas, 2012. 
 Complete Bach Cantatas. 12 volumes. Tarnhelm Ed. 2010.http://www.bach-cantatas.com/Books/S0102.htm

Links are found for the individual cantatas:
 Craig Smith: programme notes, Emmanuel Music
 Walter F. Bischof: The Bach Cantatas, University of Alberta
 Z. Philip Ambrose: Texts of the Complete Vocal Works with English Translation and Commentary, University of Vermont

External links

Bach Cantatas website, a link to information about works, translations to various languages, prescribed reading, commentaries, singers, ensembles, recordings 
Johann Sebastian Bach on "IMSLP / Petrucci Music Library, The free public domain sheet music library"
Emmanuel Music notes and translations to English
The cantatas of Johann Sebastian Bach A listener and student guide, Julian Mincham, 2010
Johann Sebastian Bach – A Listener's Guide to the Cantatas and a list of book and references by Simon Crouch on the Classical Net website